= Wedding of Frederik, Crown Prince of Denmark, and Mary Donaldson =

2004 Danish royal wedding

- Frederik and Mary on their wedding day
- Date: 14 May 2004; 22 years ago
- Venue: Copenhagen Cathedral
- Location: Copenhagen, Denmark
- Participants: Frederik, Crown Prince of Denmark; Mary Donaldson

The wedding of Frederik, Crown Prince of Denmark, and Mary Donaldson (later King Frederik X and Queen Mary) took place on 14 May 2004 in the Copenhagen Cathedral.

== Courtship and engagement ==
Crown Prince Frederik of Denmark met Mary Donaldson on 16 September 2000, during the 2000 Summer Olympics in Sydney. Frederik identified himself as the Crown Prince of Denmark at the height of their courtship. Their relationship was kept low-profile, although some Danish media reported the two were dating. On 24 September 2003, it was announced that Frederik's mother, Queen Margrethe II, intended to give her consent to the marriage at the State Council meeting scheduled for 8 October 2003.

Frederik and Mary became officially engaged on 8 October 2003. Frederik presented Mary with an engagement ring featuring an emerald cut diamond and two emerald cut ruby baguettes. Prior to the wedding, Mary, who had previously been a dual citizen of Australia and the United Kingdom, was granted Danish citizenship. She also converted from Presbyterianism to the Lutheran Church of Denmark. The media portrayed Frederik's and Mary's relationship as a modern "fairytale" romance between a prince and a commoner.

== Wedding ceremony ==
The wedding ceremony was held on 14 May 2004 in the Copenhagen Cathedral in Copenhagen, Denmark, followed by the wedding festivities at the Fredensborg Palace. Mary's sisters Jane Stephens and Patricia Bailey, and her friend Amber Petty served as bridesmaids, while Frederik's brother Prince Joachim of Denmark was the best man. Mary's nieces Erin and Kate Stephens and Madisson Woods were flower girls, and Frederik's nephew Prince Nikolai of Denmark and first cousin once removed Count Richard von Pfeil und Klein-Ellguth were pageboys.

Mary wore a wedding dress created by Danish fashion designer Uffe Frank with a veil first used by Crown Princess Margareta of Sweden, and then by her daughter Queen Ingrid of Denmark. The veil, made from Irish lace, was later worn by Ingrid's daughters Margrethe, Benedikte and Anne-Marie as well as her granddaughters, Alexia and Alexandra. (Nathalie would since wear it at her wedding in 2010). This makes Mary the first and only person not born into a royal family to wear the veil. Mary's wedding tiara was a gift from Queen Margrethe and Prince Henrik.

The bride's bouquet contained white roses, creme lathyrus, rhododendron, azalea, green gloriosa, Australian eucalyptus, and, in keeping with a Swedish royal tradition brought into the Danish royal family by the Swedish-born Queen Ingrid, a sprig of myrtle.

=== Music ===
Two choirs, the Copenhagen Boys Choir and the Church of Our Lady's choir; one orchestra, Concerto Copenhagen; and the fanfare ensemble from the Royal Life Guards Music Band played the music for the service.

The bride processed down the aisle accompanied by her father to the anthem "Zadok the Priest" which is traditionally used for British coronations. It was composed by George Frideric Handel for the coronation of Crown Prince Frederik's ancestor King George II of Great Britain, in 1727.

The congregational hymns sung at the wedding included "Den signede dag med fryd vi ser" and "Eternal Father, Strong to Save". The latter is traditionally associated with the maritime armed services. This hymn was also played at Mary's mother's funeral in 1997, hence why it was chosen. Crown Prince Frederik notably served with the Danish naval elite special operations forces, the Frogman Corps. The motet "Sicut cervus" by Giovanni Pierluigi da Palestrina was performed by the Copenhagen Boys Choir during the ceremony. The motet holds a special significance to the Danish royal family and was played at the Queen and Prince Consort's wedding in 1967, at King Frederik IX's funeral in 1972 and at Prince Joachim's wedding to Alexandra Manley in 1994.

Charles-Marie Widor's Symphony for Organ No. 5 was played as the recessional music as it was for the wedding between Queen Margrethe II and Prince Henrik of Denmark's wedding almost 37 years before.

== Titles upon marriage ==
Upon her marriage, Mary assumed the title of her husband and became Her Royal Highness the Crown Princess of Denmark. With Frederik's accession to the Danish throne in 2024, Mary automatically became the queen consort of Denmark. She was also honoured with the Order of the Elephant, and her father John Donaldson with the grand cross of the Order of the Dannebrog. In accordance with the statutes of the Danish Royal Orders, both of them were granted a personal coat of arms.

On 29 April 2008, Frederik and Mary were also created the Count and the Countess of Monpezat.

== Guest list ==
=== Danish royalty ===
- The Queen and Prince Henrik of Denmark, the groom's parents
  - Prince Joachim and Princess Alexandra of Denmark, the groom's brother and sister-in-law
    - Prince Nikolai of Denmark, the groom's godson and nephew
- The Princess and Prince of Sayn-Wittgenstein-Berleburg, the groom's maternal aunt and uncle
  - The Hereditary Prince of Sayn-Wittgenstein-Berleburg, the groom's first cousin
  - Princess Alexandra, Countess von Pfeil und Klein-Ellguth and Count Jefferson von Pfeil und Klein-Ellguth, the groom's first cousin and her husband
    - Count Richard von Pfeil und Klein-Ellguth, the groom's first cousin once removed
  - Princess Nathalie of Sayn-Wittgenstein-Berleburg, the groom's first cousin
- Queen Anne-Marie and King Constantine II of Greece, the groom's maternal aunt (and godmother) and uncle
  - Princess Alexia and Carlos Morales, the groom's first cousin and her husband
  - Crown Prince Pavlos and Crown Princess Marie-Chantal of Greece, the groom's first cousin and his wife
  - Prince Nikolaos of Greece and Denmark, the groom's first cousin
  - Princess Theodora of Greece and Denmark, the groom's first cousin
- Princess Elisabeth of Denmark, the groom's first cousin, once removed
- Count Ingolf and Countess Sussie of Rosenborg, the groom's first cousin, once removed and his wife
- Count Christian and Countess Anne Dorte of Rosenborg, the groom's first cousin, once removed and his wife
  - Countess Josephine of Rosenborg and Thomas Schmidt, the groom's second cousin and her husband
  - Countess Camilla of Rosenborg and Mikael Rosanes, the groom's second cousin and her husband
  - Countess Feodora of Rosenborg and Eric Patte, the groom's second cousin and her fiancée
- Countess Ruth of Rosenborg, widow of the groom's second cousin, once removed
  - Count Axel and Countess Jutta of Rosenborg, the groom's third cousin and his wife
  - Count Carl Johan of Rosenborg, the groom's third cousin
- Countess Karin of Rosenborg, widow of the groom's second cousin, twice removed
  - Count Valdemar and Countess Charlotte of Rosenborg, the groom's third cousin, once removed, and his wife
    - Count Nicolai of Rosenborg, the groom's fourth cousin
  - Countess Marina of Rosenborg, the groom's third cousin, once removed
- Christian Castenskiold, the groom's first cousin, twice removed, son of Princess Dagmar of Denmark
- Countess Thyra of Castell-Castell, the groom's second cousin, once removed, granddaughter of Prince Harald of Denmark

=== Monpezat family ===
- Françoise de Laborde de Monpezat and Claude Bardin, the groom's paternal aunt and uncle
  - Xavier and Catherine Bardin, the groom's paternal cousin and his wife
  - Antoine and Carmen Bardin, the groom's paternal cousin and his wife
  - Guillaume and Laurence Bardin, the groom's paternal cousin and his wife
- Count Étienne and Countess Isabelle de Laborde de Monpezat, the groom's paternal uncle and aunt
  - Count Raphaël de Laborde de Monpezat, the groom's paternal cousin
  - Count Bertrand de Laborde de Monpezat, the groom's paternal cousin
  - Count Arthur de Laborde de Monpezat, the groom's paternal cousin
- Count Jean-Baptiste and Countess Jill de Laborde de Monpezat, the groom's paternal uncle and aunt
  - Clémence de Laborde de Monpezat, the groom's paternal cousin
  - Count Grégoire de Laborde de Monpezat, the groom's paternal cousin
- Maurille de Laborde de Monpezat and Jacques Beauvillain, the groom's paternal aunt and uncle
  - Pierre and Clotilde Beauvillain, the groom's paternal cousin and his wife
  - Thomas and Mie Beauvillain, the groom's paternal cousin and his Danish wife
  - Anne-Marie and Vincent Diego, the groom's paternal cousin and her husband
  - Vincent Beauvillain, the groom's paternal cousin
  - Cécile and Jérôme Beuste, the groom's paternal cousin and her husband
  - Benoit Beauvillain, the groom's paternal cousin
  - Louis Beauvillain, the groom's paternal cousin

=== Donaldson family ===
- John and Susan Donaldson, the bride's father and stepmother
  - Jane and Craig Stephens, the bride's sister and brother-in-law
    - Alexander Stephens, the bride's nephew
    - Erin Stephens, the bride's niece
    - Kate Stephens, the bride's niece
  - Patricia and Scott Bailey, the bride's sister and brother-in-law
    - Michael Woods, the bride's nephew
    - Maddison Woods, the bride's niece
  - John and Leanne Donaldson, the bride's brother and sister-in-law
- Ben Moody, the bride's stepbrother
- Peter and Alison Donaldson, the bride's paternal uncle and aunt
  - Margaret Howard, the bride's paternal cousin
  - Jacqueline and Brendon Johncock, the bride's paternal cousin and her husband
  - Alison Donaldson, the bride's paternal cousin
- Roy and John Pugh, the bride's paternal aunt and uncle
- Margaret Cunningham, the bride's paternal grandaunt
- Catherine Murray, the bride's maternal aunt
  - Jack and Barbara Maton, the bride's maternal cousin

=== Foreign royalty ===
==== Members of reigning royal families ====
- The King and Queen of Sweden, The King is the groom's first cousin, once removed, through Gustaf VI Adolf of Sweden
  - The Crown Princess of Sweden, the groom's second cousin
  - (Sweden) Prince Carl Philip, Duke of Värmland, the groom's second cousin
  - (Sweden) Princess Madeleine, Duchess of Hälsingland and Gästrikland, the groom's second cousin
- Count Carl Johan and Countess Gunnila Bernadotte of Wisborg, The Count is the groom's maternal great-uncle through Gustaf VI Adolf of Sweden
- The King and Queen of Norway, The King is the groom's second cousin, once removed, through Christian IX of Denmark
  - The Crown Prince and Crown Princess of Norway, the groom's third cousin and his wife
  - Princess Märtha Louise of Norway and Ari Behn, the groom's third cousin and her husband
- The King and Queen of the Belgians, The King is the groom's second cousin, once removed, through Frederick VIII of Denmark
  - (Belgium) The Duke and Duchess of Brabant, the groom's third cousin and his wife
  - Princess Astrid of Belgium and the Archduke of Austria-Este, the groom's third cousin and her husband
  - Prince Laurent and Princess Claire of Belgium, the groom's third cousin and his wife
- The Queen of the Netherlands, The Queen is the groom's fourth cousin, twice removed, through William I of the Netherlands
  - The Prince of Orange and Princess Máxima of the Netherlands, the groom's fifth cousin, once removed, and his wife
  - Prince Constantijn and Princess Laurentien of the Netherlands, the groom's fifth cousin, once removed, and his wife
- The Queen of Spain the groom's third cousin once removed through Christian IX of Denmark (representing the King of Spain)
  - (Spain) The Duchess and Duke of Lugo, the groom's fourth cousin and her husband
  - (Spain) The Duchess and Duke of Palma de Mallorca, the groom's fourth cousin and her husband
  - (Spain) The Prince of Asturias and Letizia Ortiz, the groom's fourth cousin and his fiancée
- The Crown Prince of Japan (representing the Emperor of Japan)
- The Earl and Countess of Wessex, The Earl is the groom's third cousin, once removed, through Christian IX of Denmark (representing the Queen of the United Kingdom)
- The Grand Duke and Grand Duchess of Luxembourg, The Grand Duke is the groom's third cousin through Frederick VIII of Denmark
  - The Hereditary Grand Duke of Luxembourg, the groom's third cousin, once removed
- Prince Guillaume of Luxembourg, the groom's third cousin
- The Hereditary Prince of Monaco (representing the Prince of Monaco)
- Princess Caroline of Monaco and the Prince of Hanover The Prince is the groom's third cousin, once removed, through Christian IX of Denmark
- Prince Wenzeslaus of Liechtenstein (representing the Prince of Liechtenstein)

==== Members of non-reigning royal families ====
- Empress Farah Pahlavi of Iran
- The Aga Khan
- Crown Prince Alexander and Crown Princess Katherine of Yugoslavia, The Crown Prince is the groom's fourth cousin through Christian IX of Denmark
- The Prince of Prussia, The Prince is the groom's third cousin through Frederick Francis III, Grand Duke of Mecklenburg-Schwerin
- Prince Phillip of Hesse, The Prince is the groom's fourth cousin through Queen Victoria
- Princess Xenia of Hohenlohe-Langenburg, The Princess is the groom's fourth cousin through Christian IX of Denmark
- Prince Wilhelm and Princess Ilona of Schaumburg-Lippe, The Prince is the groom's second cousin, once removed, through Frederick VIII of Denmark
  - Princess Désirée of Schaumburg-Lippe and Hofjægermester Michael Iuel, the groom's third cousin and her husband
- Princess Eleonore of Schaumburg-Lippe, The Princess is the groom's third cousin through Frederick VIII of Denmark
- Archduchess Francesca of Austria
- Prince Dimitri and Princess Dorrit Romanov, The Prince is the groom's third cousin, twice removed, through Nicholas I of Russia
- The Prince and Princess of Turnovo
- The Duke and Duchess of Braganza
- The Prince and Princess of Naples
- The Duke and Duchess of Castro

=== Politicians and diplomats ===
- Tarja Halonen, President of Finland, and Dr. Pentti Arajärvi
- Ólafur Ragnar Grímsson, President of Iceland, and Dorrit Moussaieff
- Anders Fogh Rasmussen, Prime Minister of Denmark, and Anne-Mette Rasmussen
- Hans Enoksen, Prime Minister of Greenland, and Aaliiaraq Enoksen
- Jóannes Eidesgaard, Prime Minister of the Faroe Islands, and Anita Joensen
- (France) Bernadette Chirac
- Michael Jeffery, Governor-General of Australia
- Richard Butler, Governor of Tasmania
- Anker Jørgensen, former Prime Minister of Denmark
- Poul Nyrup Rasmussen, former Prime Minister of Denmark, and Lone Dybkjær
- Jonathan Motzfeldt, former Prime Minister of Greenland, and Kristjana Gudmundsdottir
- Edmund Joensen, former Prime Minister of the Faroe Islands, and Edfríö Johnsen
- (Denmark) Jens Kramer Mikkelsen, Lord Mayor of Copenhagen, and Connie Mikkelsen

=== Nobility ===
- (Denmark) Count Michael Ahlefeldt-Laurvig-Bille
  - (Denmark) Count Gregers Ahlefeldt-Laurvig-Bille, the groom's godson
- (Denmark) Countess Helle Knuth (author and wife of the founder of Knuthenborg Safaripark)
  - (Denmark) Count Christoffer Knuth (owner of Knuthenborg)

=== Other notable guests ===
- Joen Bille (actor) and Bente Scavenius (art historian)
- Thomas Blachman (jazz musician)
- Tatiana Blatnik (future wife of Prince Nikolaos of Greece and Denmark)
- Bitten Clausen (widow of the founder of Danfoss)
  - Jørgen Mads Clausen (chairman of Danfoss), and wife, Anette Nøhr Clausen
- Bent Fabricius-Bjerre (pianist and composer)
- Nils Foss (founder of Foss A/S), and wife, Dorte Foss
- Kjeld (Lieutenant General in the Danish Army) and Birgitta Hillingsø (former classmate of Queen Margrethe II)
  - Ellen Hillingsø (Danish actress and goddaughter of Queen Margrethe II), and husband, Christoffer Castenskiold
- Kasper Holten (stage director) and Kamilla Bech Holten (TV host)
- Kjeld Kirk Kristiansen (CEO of The Lego Group), and wife, Camilla Kristiansen
- Bo Lidegaard (historian), and wife, Vibeke Sejrbo Nielsen
- Mærsk Mc-Kinney Møller (shipping magnate)
- Sir Roger Moore (actor), and Danish wife, Kristina, Lady Moore
- Else Pedersen (former nanny of the Crown Prince)
- Amber Petty (friend of the bride)
- Thomas Vinterberg (film director), and wife, Maria Vinterberg
- Peter Zobel (businessman), and wife, Henriette Zobel (designer)

== Wedding attendants ==
=== Bridesmaids and best man ===
- Jane Stephens, bridesmaid
- Patricia Bailey, bridesmaid
- Amber Petty, bridesmaid
- Prince Joachim of Denmark, the best man

=== Flower girls and page boys ===
- Erin Stephens, aged 8 – Mary's niece, daughter of Jane and Craig Stephens
- Kate Stephens, aged 6 – Mary's niece, daughter of Jane and Craig Stephens
- Madisson Woods, aged 8 – Mary's niece, daughter of Patricia Bailey
- Prince Nikolai of Denmark, aged 4 – nephew and godson of Crown Prince Frederik and son of Prince Joachim and Princess Alexandra of Denmark
- Count Richard von Pfeil und Klein-Ellguth, aged 4 – son of Frederik's cousin Princess Alexandra of Sayn-Wittgenstein-Berleburg and Count Jefferson von Pfeil und Klein-Ellguth

== Carriage procession ==
A carriage procession followed the wedding ceremony, during which the couple was transported from Copenhagen Cathedral through the streets of Copenhagen to Amalienborg Palace on a route that was two kilometers long. The couple was transported in the Danish royal family's Barouche from 1906. The newlyweds subsequently appeared with their immediate family on the balcony of Amalienborg Palace in front of more than 20.000 people at Amalienborg's courtyard.

== Wedding banquet ==
The wedding banquet was held on the evening of the wedding day at Fredensborg Palace. The newlyweds arrived in Fredensborg from Amalienborg Palace by carriage, The Prince's Landau, from 1889. Approximately 400 guests were invited for the banquet which took place in a tent in the Palace gardens. Prince Henrik, Queen Margrethe II, John Donaldson and the groom all made speeches during the dinner. After the dinner, Frederik and Mary danced the traditional wedding waltz to "The Wedding Waltz" from Niels W. Gade's A Folk Tale in Fredensborg Palace's Dome Hall. According to tradition, the waltz must take place before midnight which the couple succeeded in despite being slightly behind schedule.
