= Count Jefferson von Pfeil und Klein-Ellguth =

German count

Count Jefferson von Pfeil and Klein-Ellguth
- Born: 12 July 1967 (age 59); Mainz, Germany
- Other name: Jefferson-Friedrich Volker Benjamin Graf von Pfeil und Klein-Ellguth
- Title: Count von Pfeil and Klein-Ellguth
- Spouse: Princess Alexandra of Sayn-Wittgenstein-Berleburg (m. 1998; div. 2017)
- Children: Count Richard; Countess Ingrid
- Parent(s): Count Friedrich-August von Pfeil und Klein-Ellguth; Astrid Maria Andres

Count Jefferson von Pfeil und Klein-Ellguth (Jefferson-Friedrich Volker Benjamin Graf von Pfeil und Klein-Ellguth; born 12 July 1967) is a German nobleman and a banker.

== Early life and ancestry ==
Jefferson is born as the younger son and the youngest child of German Count Friedrich-August Rüdiger Albrecht von Pfeil und Klein-Ellguth (b. 1930) and his wife, Astrid Maria Andres (b. 1930). By birth he is a member of an ancient House of Pfeil und Klein-Ellguth, which can trace their noble ancestry back to the beginning of the 12th century.

== Marriage and family ==
He married Princess Alexandra of Sayn-Wittgenstein-Berleburg on 6 June 1998, becoming the husband of a member of the Danish royal family. Jefferson and Alexandra are distantly related, as both have descended from Leopold III, Duke of Anhalt-Dessau.

Princess Alexandra is the daughter of Princess Benedikte of Denmark, whose elder sister is Queen Margrethe II. The couple were married in Graasten Palace Chapel, a part of the Danish royal family's summer residence in southern Jutland. According to an article in the Copenhagen Post, Princess Alexandra was granted Danish citizenship just prior to her marriage. The couple were sweethearts during their childhood years at Louisenlund school, in Germany.

The couple resided in Paris, where Count Jefferson was a managing director of the Swiss bank Sal. Oppenheim.

Since 2013 they lived in Heidesheim Castle, Germany, near Mainz. They were always among the Danish royal family for the summer holidays at Gråsten Palace.

They have two children:

- Count Friedrich Richard Oscar Jefferson von Pfeil und Klein-Ellguth (born 14 September 1999 at the Rigshospitalet). Count Richard was christened in the chapel of Schloss Berleburg, Berleburg, Germany, on 18 December 1999. His godparents are Gustav, Hereditary Prince of Sayn-Wittgenstein-Berleburg (maternal uncle), Prince Nikolaos of Greece and Denmark (mother's maternal first cousin), Prince Philipp of Hesse (mother's paternal cousin), Princess Märtha Louise of Norway, Countess Andrea of Pfeil-Haag, and Nadine Kettaneh-Farah (father's cousin). He is named after his grandfather Prince Richard von Sayn-Wittgenstein-Berleburg.
- Countess Ingrid Alexandra Irma Astrid Benedikte von Pfeil und Klein-Ellguth (born 16 August 2003, at Rigshospitalet the Copenhagen University Hospital). Countess Ingrid was christened at the chapel, Schloss Berleburg, Berleburg, Germany. Her godparents are Princess Nathalie of Sayn-Wittgenstein-Berleburg (maternal aunt), Countess Bettina von Pfeil and Klein-Ellguth (paternal aunt), Frederik X of Denmark (then Crown Prince) (mother's maternal first cousin), Princess Alexia of Greece and Denmark (mother's maternal first cousin) and Prince Georg of Sayn-Wittgenstein-Hohenstein, Martin Bleyer. She is named after her great-grandmother Ingrid of Sweden.

The couple announced their intention to divorce in May 2017. On 18 May 2019 Princess Alexandra married Count Michael Ahlefeldt-Laurvig-Bille (b. 26 February 1965), a member of the ancient House of Ahlefeldt.
