= Richard, 6th Prince of Sayn-Wittgenstein-Berleburg =

German landowner (1934–2017)

Richard
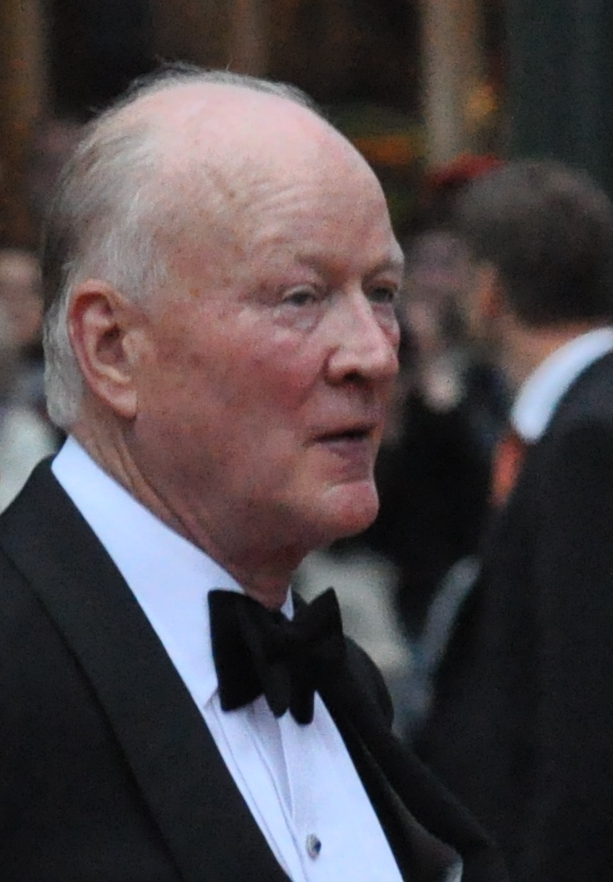
- The Prince in Stockholm at Crown Princess Victoria of Sweden's wedding celebrations, June 2010

Prince of Sayn-Wittgenstein-Berleburg
- Reign: 1944 – 13 March 2017
- Predecessor: Prince Gustav Albrecht
- Successor: Prince Gustav
- Born: 29 October 1934; Giessen, Hesse, Germany
- Died: 13 March 2017 (aged 82); Berleburg, Siegen-Wittgenstein, North Rhine-Westphalia, Germany
- Burial: 21 March 2017; Forest Cemetery Sengelsberg, Berleburg
- Spouse: Princess Benedikte of Denmark (m. 1968)
- Issue: Gustav, 7th Prince of Sayn-Wittgenstein-Berleburg; Princess Alexandra; Princess Nathalie
Names
- Richard Casimir Karl August Robert Konstantin
- House: Sayn-Wittgenstein-Berleburg
- Father: Gustav Albrecht, 5th Prince of Sayn-Wittgenstein-Berleburg
- Mother: Margareta Fouché d'Otrante

Richard, 6th Prince of Sayn-Wittgenstein-Berleburg (Richard Casimir Karl August Robert Konstantin; 29 October 1934 – 13 March 2017) was the head of the House of Sayn-Wittgenstein-Berleburg and husband of Princess Benedikte of Denmark.

== Early life ==
Richard Casimir Karl August Robert Konstantin was the eldest son and child of Gustav Albrecht, 5th Prince of Sayn-Wittgenstein-Berleburg, a highly decorated German army officer declared missing in 1944 yet only legally declared dead in 1969, and his wife, Margareta Fouché d'Otrante, a descendant of Napoleonic statesman Joseph Fouché, Duke d'Otrante.

== Education ==
Richard was raised in Sweden with his maternal grandfather, the Duke of Otranto, at Elghammar Castle. He attended the boarding schools Viggbyholm and Sigtuna.

Having studied arboreal science at LMU Munich, Prince Richard obtained his forestry diploma at the University of Göttingen in Lower Saxony. He took post-graduate training as Forstreferendar, obtaining a degree as Assessor des Forstdienstes after passing the second-level examination at the North Rhine Westphalian State Forestry Service.

== Marriage ==
Richard married Princess Benedikte of Denmark at Fredensborg Palace Church on 3 February 1968. She is the second daughter of Frederik IX of Denmark and Ingrid of Sweden, younger sister of Margrethe II of Denmark and elder sister of Queen Anne-Marie of Greece. The couple lived at Berleburg Castle. Pursuant to the marriage contract, in Denmark Richard and his children by Princess Benedikte were to be attributed the style of Highness, rather than the unknown Durchlaucht ("Serene Highness") to which all Sayn-Wittgenstein princes were historically entitled in Germany.

While the couple were raising their family Princess Benedikte reduced her royal engagements in Denmark, where she spent only about a quarter of her time.

=== Children and grandchildren ===
- Gustav, 7th Prince of Sayn-Wittgenstein-Berleburg (born 12 January 1969). On 3 June 2022, he married Carina Axelsson (born 5 August 1968). They have a son and a daughter.
  - Prince Gustav Albrecht (born 26 May 2023)
  - Princess Mafalda (born 26 April 2024)
- Princess Alexandra of Sayn-Wittgenstein-Berleburg (born 20 November 1970). She was married on 6 June 1998 at Gråsten Palace to Count Jefferson von Pfeil und Klein-Ellguth (born 12 July 1967). The couple have two children and divorced in 2017. She remarried on 18 May 2019 Count Michael Ahlefeldt-Laurvig-Bille (born 26 February 1965).
  - Count Friedrich Richard Oscar Jefferson von Pfeil und Klein-Ellguth (born 14 September 1999)
  - Countess Ingrid Alexandra Irma Astrid Benedikte von Pfeil und Klein-Ellguth (born August 16, 2003)
- Princess Nathalie of Sayn-Wittgenstein-Berleburg (born 2 May 1975). On 27 May 2010, she married Alexander Johannsmann (born 6 December 1977). On 15 August 2022, the Danish court confirmed that Nathalie and Johannsmann had divorced. They have two children.
  - Konstantin Gustav Heinrich Richard Johannsmann (born on 24 July 2010)
  - Louisa Margareta Benedikte Hanna Johannsmann (born 28 January 2015)

== Conservation ==
Prince Richard engaged in several conservation programmes, while responsible for managing his family's extensive lands in Germany. He launched a project to re-introduce European bison to the native continent on part of his 32,000 acre estate in North Rhine-Westphalia, credited as a success by Rewilding Europe as part of a larger effort to restore depleted animals across Europe.

Berleburg Castle

== Health issues and death ==
In July 2003, he underwent surgery for treatment of prostate cancer; previously, he had undergone treatment for skin cancer.

Prince Richard died suddenly on 13 March 2017 at the castle of Berleburg in Germany. He was 82.

== Titles, styles and honours ==
Styles of Richard, 6th Prince of Sayn-Wittgenstein-Berleburg
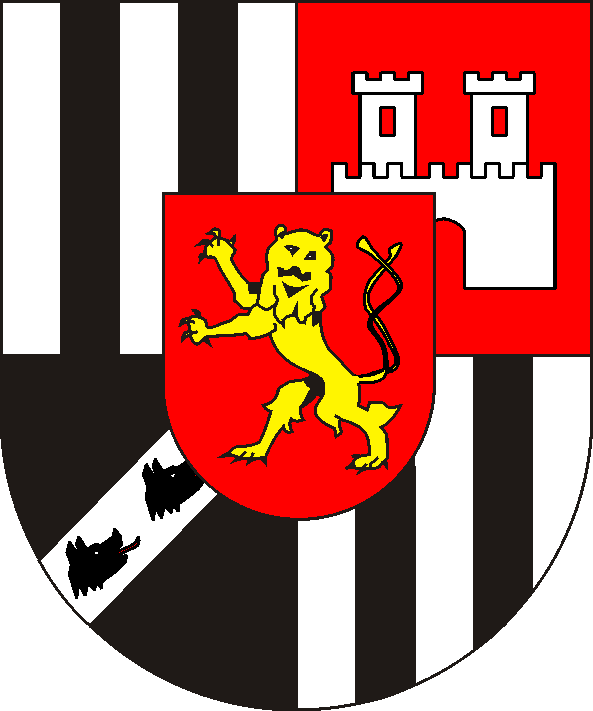
- Reference style: His Highness
- Spoken style: Your Highness

=== Titles ===
29 October 1934 – 1944: His Serene Highness Prince Richard of Sayn-Wittgenstein-Berleburg

1944 – 3 February 1968: His Serene Highness The Prince of Sayn-Wittgenstein-Berleburg

3 February 1968 – 13 March 2017: His Highness The Prince of Sayn-Wittgenstein-Berleburg

=== Honours ===
==== National honours ====
- Germany: Grand Cross of the Order of Merit of the Federal Republic of Germany, 1st Class
- Denmark: Knight of the Order of the Elephant (R.E.)
- Denmark: Recipient of the 50th Anniversary Medal of the Arrival of Queen Ingrid to Denmark
- Denmark: Recipient of the 50th Birthday Medal of Queen Margrethe II
- Denmark: Recipient of the Silver Anniversary Medal of Queen Margrethe II and Prince Henrik
- Denmark: Recipient of the Silver Jubilee Medal of Queen Margrethe II
- Denmark: Recipient of the 100th Anniversary Medal of the Birth of King Frederik IX
- Denmark: Recipient of the Queen Ingrid Commemorative Medal
- Denmark: Recipient of the 75th Birthday Medal of Prince Henrik
- Denmark: Recipient of the 70th Birthday Medal of Queen Margrethe II
- Denmark: Recipient of the Ruby Jubilee Medal of Queen Margrethe II

==== Foreign honours ====
- Sweden: Commander Grand Cross of the Royal Order of the Polar Star
- Spain: Knight Grand Cross of the Order of Isabella the Catholic
- Netherlands: Grand Cross of the Order of the Crown

Richard, 6th Prince of Sayn-Wittgenstein-Berleburg House of Sayn-Wittgenstein-Berleburg Born: 29 October 1934
Titles in pretence
Preceded by Prince Gustav Albrecht	— TITULAR — Prince of Sayn-Wittgenstein-Berleburg; 1969–2017; Reason for succession failure: German Revolution of 1918-19	Succeeded by Prince Gustav
