= Princess Benedikte of Denmark =

Princess of Sayn-Wittgenstein-Berleburg (born 1944)

Princess Benedikte
- Princess of Sayn-Wittgenstein-Berleburg
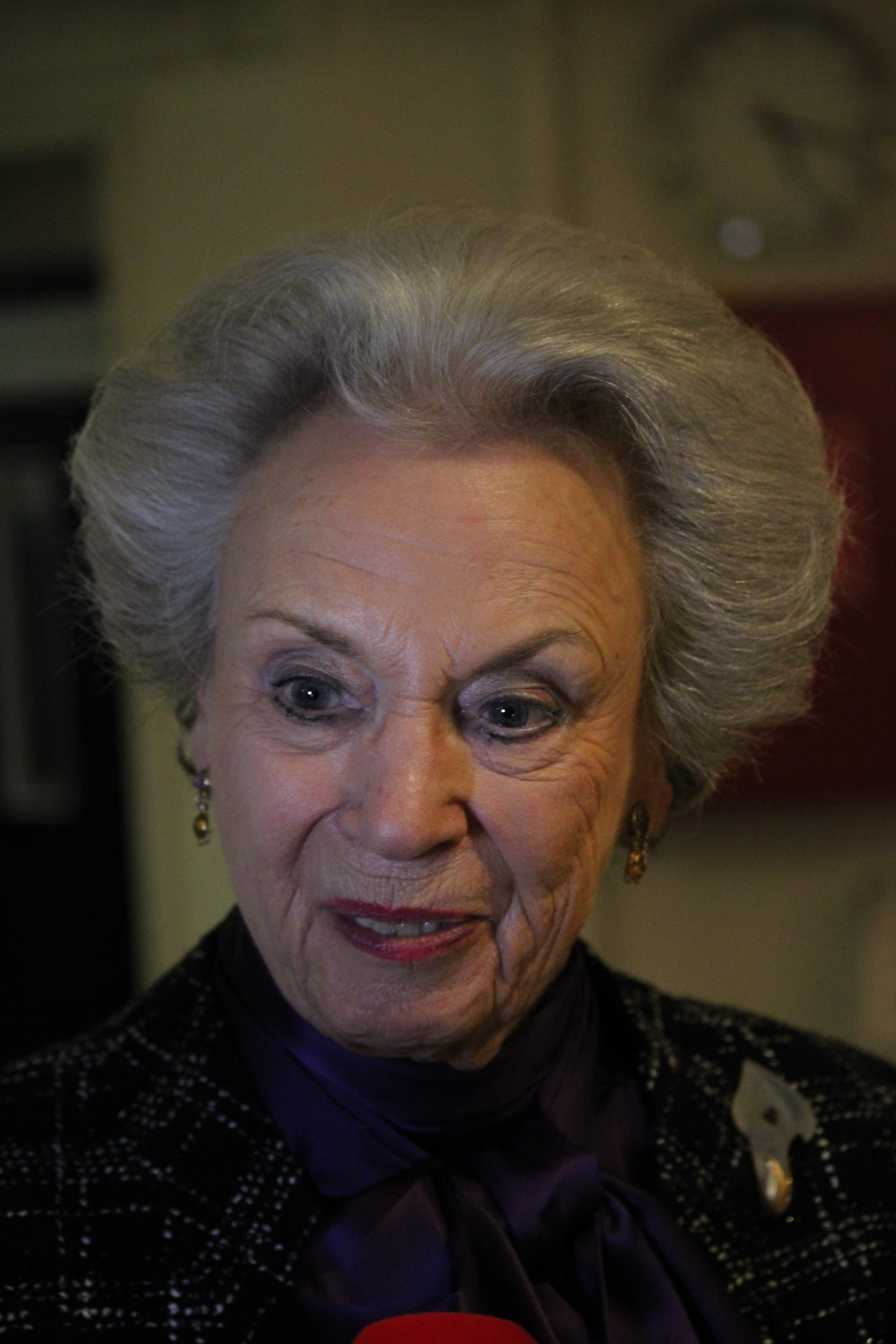
- Benedikte in 2025
- Born: 29 April 1944 (age 82); Amalienborg Palace, Copenhagen, Denmark
- Spouse: Richard, 6th Prince of Sayn-Wittgenstein-Berleburg (m. 1968; died 2017)
- Issue: Gustav, 7th Prince of Sayn-Wittgenstein-Berleburg; Princess Alexandra, Countess Ahlefeldt-Laurvig-Bille; Princess Nathalie
Names
- Benedikte Astrid Ingeborg Ingrid
- House: Glücksburg
- Father: Frederik IX of Denmark
- Mother: Ingrid of Sweden

Princess Benedikte of Denmark, Princess of Sayn-Wittgenstein-Berleburg (Benedikte Astrid Ingeborg Ingrid, born 29 April 1944) is a member of the Danish royal family. She is the second daughter and child of King Frederik IX and Queen Ingrid of Denmark. She is a younger sister of Queen Margrethe II of Denmark, and therefore an aunt of Margrethe's son, the current King of Denmark, Frederik X. She is also an older sister of Queen Anne-Marie of Greece.

Princess Benedikte often represents the Danish monarch at official or semi-official events. She and her late husband, Richard, 6th Prince of Sayn-Wittgenstein-Berleburg, had three children. Princess Benedikte is currently tenth and last in the line of succession to the Danish throne.

== Early life ==
=== Birth and family ===
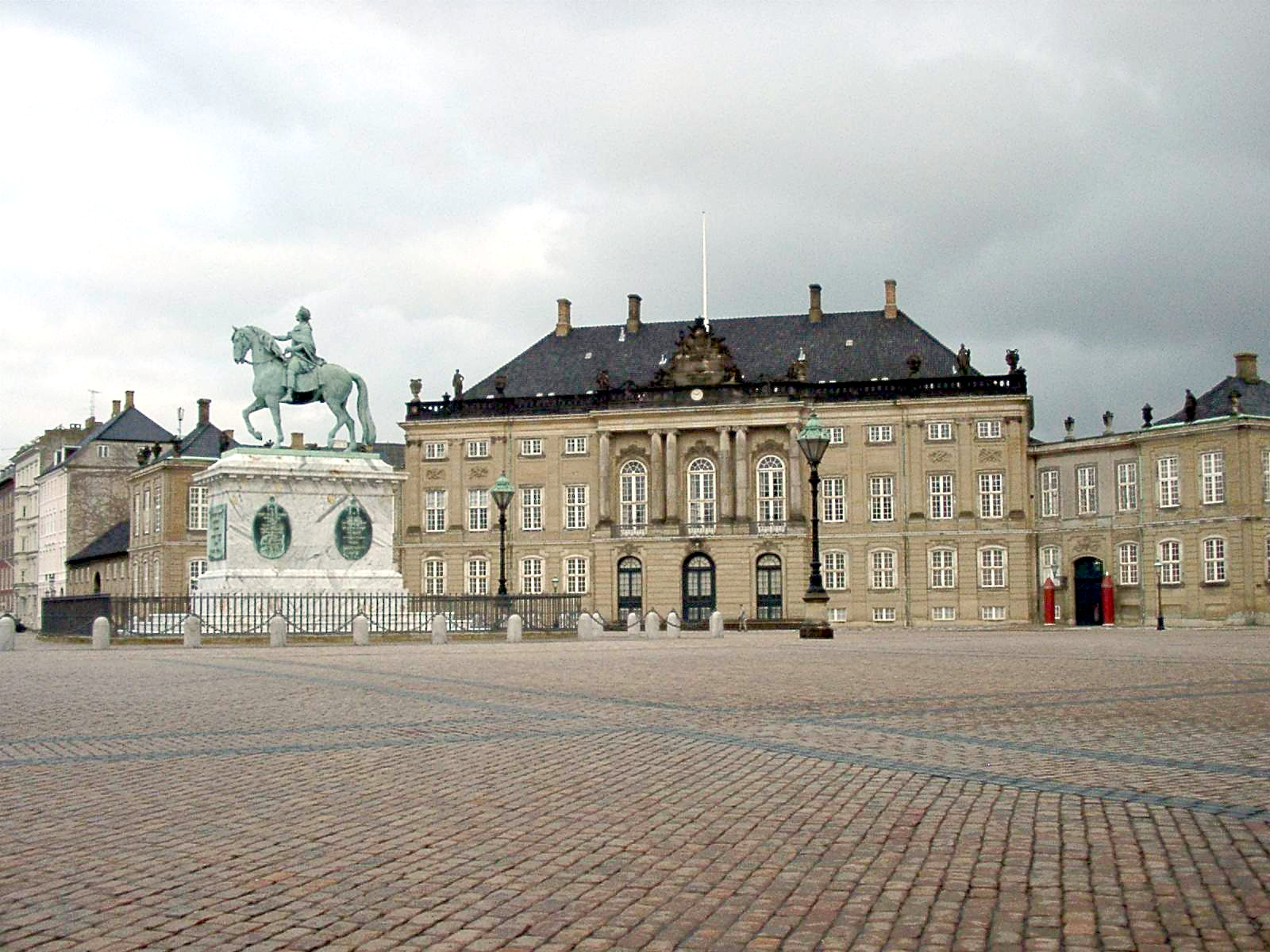
Princess Benedikte's birthplace: Frederik VIII's Palace at Amalienborg

Benedikte was born on 29 April 1944 at Frederik VIII's Palace, her parents' residence at the Amalienborg palace complex, the principal residence of the Danish royal family in the district of Frederiksstaden in central Copenhagen. She was the second child and daughter of Crown Prince Frederik and Crown Princess Ingrid of Denmark. Her father was the eldest son of King Christian X and Queen Alexandrine of Denmark, and her mother was the only daughter of Crown Prince Gustav Adolf of Sweden and his first wife, Princess Margaret of Connaught.

Her birth took place during Nazi Germany's Occupation of Denmark. The day after the birth of the princess, members of the Danish resistance group Holger Danske performed a salute of 21 bombs in the Ørstedsparken public park in central Copenhagen as a reference to the traditional 21-gun salute performed by the Danish Army and Navy at the occasion of royal births.

She was baptised on 24 May, her parents' 9th wedding anniversary, at the Holmen Church in Copenhagen. Her godparents were King Christian X and Queen Alexandrine of Denmark (her paternal grandparents); Prince Gustav of Denmark (paternal grand-uncle); King Gustaf V of Sweden (maternal great-grandfather), Sigvard Bernadotte (maternal uncle); Princess Caroline-Mathilde of Denmark (paternal aunt by marriage); Princess Ingeborg of Denmark (paternal grand-aunt); Princess Margaretha of Sweden (her father's first cousin); Sir Alexander Ramsay (maternal grand-uncle by marriage) and Queen Elizabeth of the United Kingdom.

Benedikte has one elder sister, Margrethe, former Queen of Denmark, and a younger sister, Anne Marie, who was born in 1946 and married Constantine II of Greece.

=== Childhood and education ===
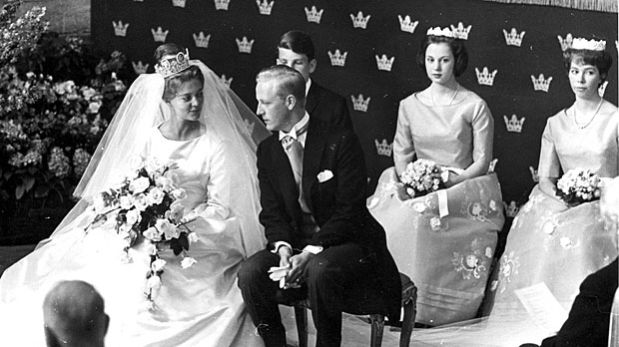
Princess Benedikte as a bridesmaid at the 1962 wedding of Princess Birgitta of Sweden and Prince Johann Georg of Hohenzollern

Benedikte and her sisters grew up in apartments at Frederik VIII's Palace at Amalienborg in Copenhagen and in Fredensborg Palace in North Zealand. She spent the summer holidays with the royal family at her parents' summer residence at Gråsten Palace in Southern Jutland. On 20 April 1947, King Christian X died and Benedikte's father ascended the throne as King Frederik IX.

At the time of her father's accession to the throne, only males could ascend the throne of Denmark. As her parents had no sons, it was assumed that her uncle Prince Knud would one day assume the throne. The popularity of Frederik IX and his daughters and the more prominent role of women in Danish life paved the way for a new Act of Succession in 1953 which permitted female succession to the throne following the principle of male-preference primogeniture, where a female can ascend to the throne if she has no brothers. Benedikte's elder sister Margrethe therefore became heir presumptive, and Benedikte and Anne-Marie became second and third in the line of succession.

Benedikte was educated at N. Zahle's School, a private school in Copenhagen, followed by stays at an English boarding school, Benenden School in Kent (1957), and a Swiss finishing school, Brillantmont International School in Lausanne (1960–1961). In 1965, she took a class at Margrethe-Skolen, a private fashion and design school in Copenhagen.

== Marriage ==
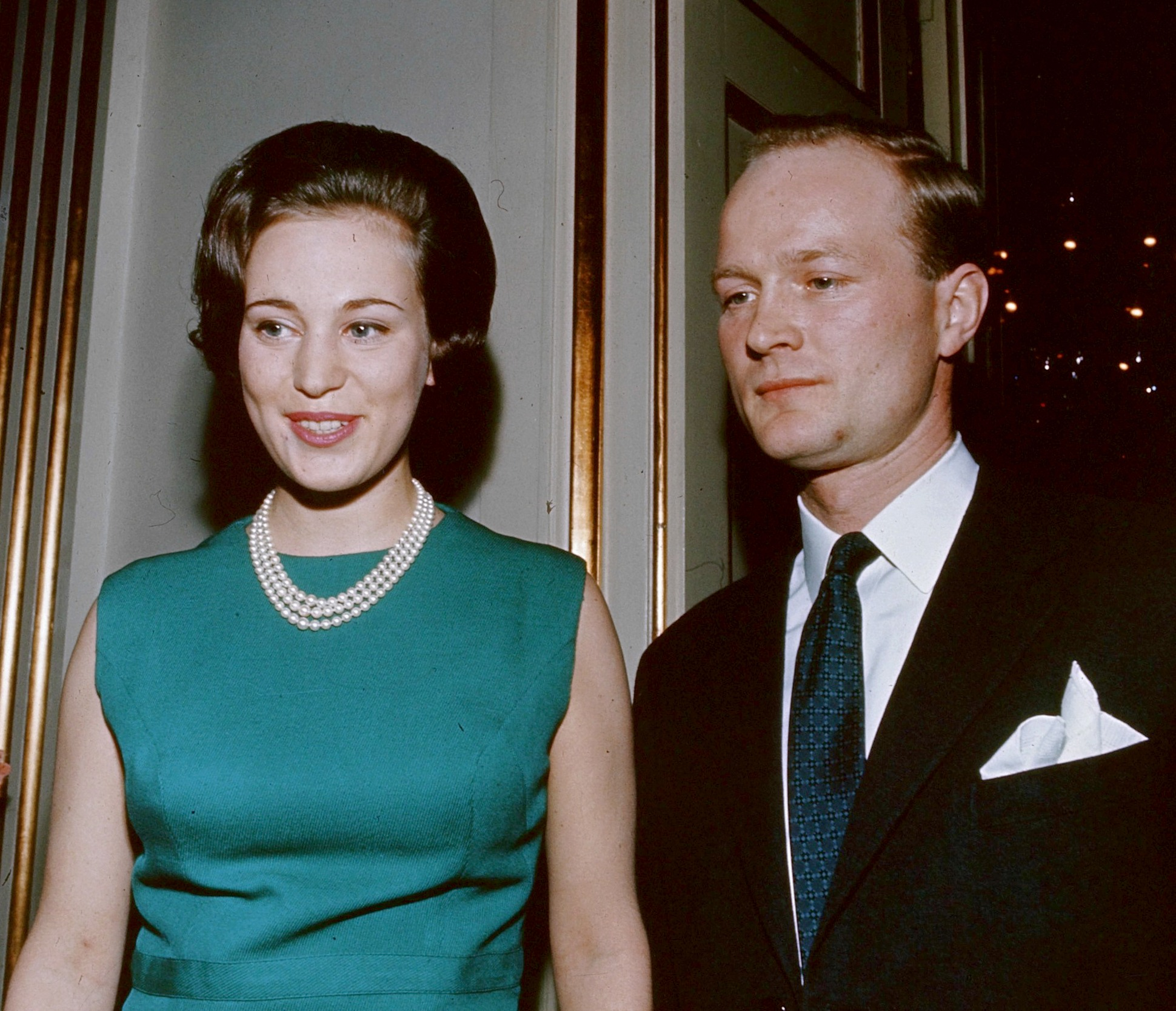
Princess Benedikte with Prince Richard before their marriage

Benedikte was married on 3 February 1968 at Fredensborg Palace Church to Richard, 6th Prince of Sayn-Wittgenstein-Berleburg (1934–2017). They had three children:

- Prince Gustav Frederik Philip Richard of Sayn-Wittgenstein-Berleburg (born 12 January 1969) who married Carina Axelsson in 2022 and with whom he has two children. He succeeded his father as 7th Prince of Sayn-Wittgenstein-Berleburg in 2017.

- Princess Alexandra Rosemarie Ingrid Benedikte of Sayn-Wittgenstein-Berleburg (born 20 November 1970) who married Count Jefferson von Pfeil und Klein-Ellguth in 1998 and with whom she has two children. The couple divorced in 2017 and she secondly married Count Michael Ahlefeldt-Laurvig-Bille in 2019.

- Princess Nathalie Xenia Margrethe Benedikte of Sayn-Wittgenstein-Berleburg (born 2 May 1975) who competed for Denmark in dressage at the 2008 and 2012 Olympics. She married Alexander Johannsmann in 2010 and with whom she has two children. The couple divorced in 2022.

Upon her marriage, it was decided that Benedikte's children would need to be raised in Denmark in order to have succession rights. Since the condition was not met, Benedikte's three children are not in line to succeed to the throne. The children of Benedikte are styled as Highnesses by a Danish Order in Council.

While she and her husband resided at Berleburg Castle, Benedikte and her family retained a close connection to Denmark. Since her husband's death in 2017, her primary residence has been her apartment at Christian VIII's Palace in Copenhagen.

== Interests ==
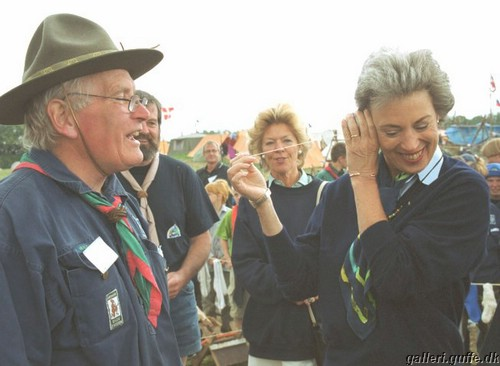
Princess Benedikte at the summer camp of The Danish Guide and Scout Association in 1999

Benedikte has undertaken official engagements for the Danish royal family since her youth, particular within the areas of equestrianism, scouting, disabilities and illnesses as well as children and youths. After Queen Ingrid's death in 2000, she took over several of her patronages and additionally began receiving a yearly appanage. Among her patronages are SOS Children's Villages (Denmark), Parasport Denmark and the National Association against Eating Disorders and Self-Harm. As of April 2026, Benedikte holds 23 patronages.

=== Equestrianism ===
Benedikte is very involved in equestrian sport and is patron of the World Breeding Federation for Sport Horses, the Danish Warmblood Association and Hestens Værn. In 1992, she became patron of the Danish Equestrian Federation (DRF). Following revelations about the handling of cases of animal cruelty within the federation as well as allegations of leadership misconduct from members of the board (on which her daughter, Nathalie, was a member) of the federation in 2024, Benedikte withdrew her patronage. The then chairman of the DRF, Dan Boyter, was revealed to have contacted the private secretaries of both Benedikte and her nephew, King Frederik X, in an effort to have Princess Nathalie (who was among 4 members of the board to raise a motion of no confidence and subsequently file a complain with the National Olympic Committee and Sports Confederation of Denmark's Ethics Committee against Boyter) removed from the board.

In 2006, she ran in an election for president of the International Equestrian Federation, but she was heavily defeated, earning only 16 votes and placing last out of the three candidates.

=== Scouting ===
Benedikte was introduced to the scouting movement when she was a teenager by her mother who had been an active patron of the Danish Girl Guides since 1936. When she was a child, a special Scout unit was created so that she could join the Guides. In 1963, at the age of 19, Benedikte stepped in for her mother, who had fallen ill, and opened the Guiding World Conference in Nyborg with a speech held in both English and French.

Benedikte has retained a close commitment to Girl Guide and Girl Scout organisations in Denmark as well as internationally. She succeeded her mother as chairman of Pigespejdernes Fællesråd Danmark (Joint Committee of Girl Guides in Denmark). She is patron of De grønne pigespejdere (The Green Girl Guides, Denmark), Det Danske Spejderkorps (The Danish Guide and Scout Association) and the Danish YWCA in London. In addition, she is patron of the Olave Baden Powell Society (OB-PS), a support organisation for the World Association of Girl Guides and Girl Scouts. She is an honorary member of the St George's Guilds in Denmark. In 2007, she was awarded with a prize of honour by this Scout association for adults.

== Honours and awards ==
Benedikte's monogram

As Princess of Denmark, Benedikte is entitled to the style "Her Royal Highness".

=== Honours ===
==== National ====
===== Orders and appointments =====
- 20 April 1947: Knight of the Order of the Elephant (R.E.)
- 27 January 1993: Grand Commander of the Order of the Dannebrog (S.Kmd.)

===== Medals and decorations =====
- Denmark: Knight of the Decoration of the Cross of Honour of the Dannebrog (D.Ht.)
- Denmark: Recipient of the Homeguard Medal of Merit
- Denmark: Recipient of the 100th Anniversary Medal of the Birth of King Christian X
- Denmark: Recipient of the 50th Anniversary Medal of the Arrival of Queen Ingrid to Denmark
- Denmark: Recipient of the 50th Birthday Medal of Queen Margrethe II
- Denmark: Recipient of the Silver Anniversary Medal of Queen Margrethe II and Prince Henrik
- Denmark: Recipient of the Silver Jubilee Medal of Queen Margrethe II
- Denmark: Recipient of the 100th Anniversary Medal of the Birth of King Frederik IX
- Denmark: Recipient of the Queen Ingrid Commemorative Medal
- Denmark: Recipient of the 75th Birthday Medal of Prince Henrik
- Denmark: Recipient of the 70th Birthday Medal of Queen Margrethe II
- Denmark: Recipient of the Ruby Jubilee Medal of Queen Margrethe II
- Denmark: Recipient of the 75th Birthday Medal of Queen Margrethe II
- Denmark: Recipient of the Golden Jubilee Medal of Queen Margrethe II

==== Foreign ====
- Argentina: Grand Cross of Order of the Liberator General San Martín
- Belgium: Knight Grand Cross of the Order of the Crown
- Egypt: Grand Cross of the Order of the Virtues
- Finland: Grand Cross of the Order of the White Rose of Finland
- Germany: Grand Cross, 1st Class of the Order of Merit of the Federal Republic of Germany
- Greek Royal Family:
  - Dame Grand Cross of the Royal Order of Saints Olga and Sophia
  - Recipient of the Commemorative Badge of the Centenary of the Royal House of Greece
- Iceland: Grand Cross of the Order of the Falcon
- (Iran) Iranian Imperial Family: Knight Grand Cordon of the Imperial Order of the Crown
- Italy: Grand Cross of the Order of Merit of the Italian Republic
- Luxembourg: Knight Grand Cross of the Order of Adolphe of Nassau
- Netherlands: Knight Grand Cross of the Order of the Crown
- Norway: Knight Grand Cross of the Order of Saint Olav
- Spain: Knight Grand Cross of the Order of Isabella the Catholic
- Sweden:
  - Member Grand Cross of the Royal Order of the Polar Star
  - Recipient of the 50th Birthday Medal of King Carl XVI Gustaf
  - Recipient of the King Carl XVI Gustaf Ruby Jubilee Medal
  - Recipient of the King Carl XVI Gustaf and Queen Silvia's Golden Wedding Medal
- Tunisia: Grand Officer of the Order of the Republic
- (Kingdom of the Two Sicilies) Two Sicilian Royal Family: Knight Grand Cross of the Order of Francis I
- Vatican: Knight of the Decoration of Honour

Princess Benedikte of Denmark House of Schleswig-Holstein-Sonderburg-Glücksburg Cadet branch of the House of Oldenburg Born: 29 April 1944
Lines of succession
Preceded by Countess Athena of Monpezat	Succession to the Danish throne 10th position	Succeeded by last in line
