= Princess Alexandra of Sayn-Wittgenstein-Berleburg =

Danish princess (born 1970)

Princess Alexandra
- Countess Michael Ahlefeldt-Laurvig-Bille
- Born: 20 November 1970 (age 55); Copenhagen, Denmark
- Spouse: Count Jefferson von Pfeil und Klein-Ellguth (m. 1998; div. 2017) Count Michael Ahlefeldt-Laurvig-Bille (m. 2019)
- Issue: Count Richard von Pfeil und Klein-Ellguth; Countess Ingrid von Pfeil und Klein-Ellguth
Names
- Alexandra Rosemarie Ingrid Benedikte
- House: Sayn-Wittgenstein-Berleburg (by birth); Ahlefeldt (by marriage)
- Father: Richard, 6th Prince of Sayn-Wittgenstein-Berleburg
- Mother: Princess Benedikte of Denmark

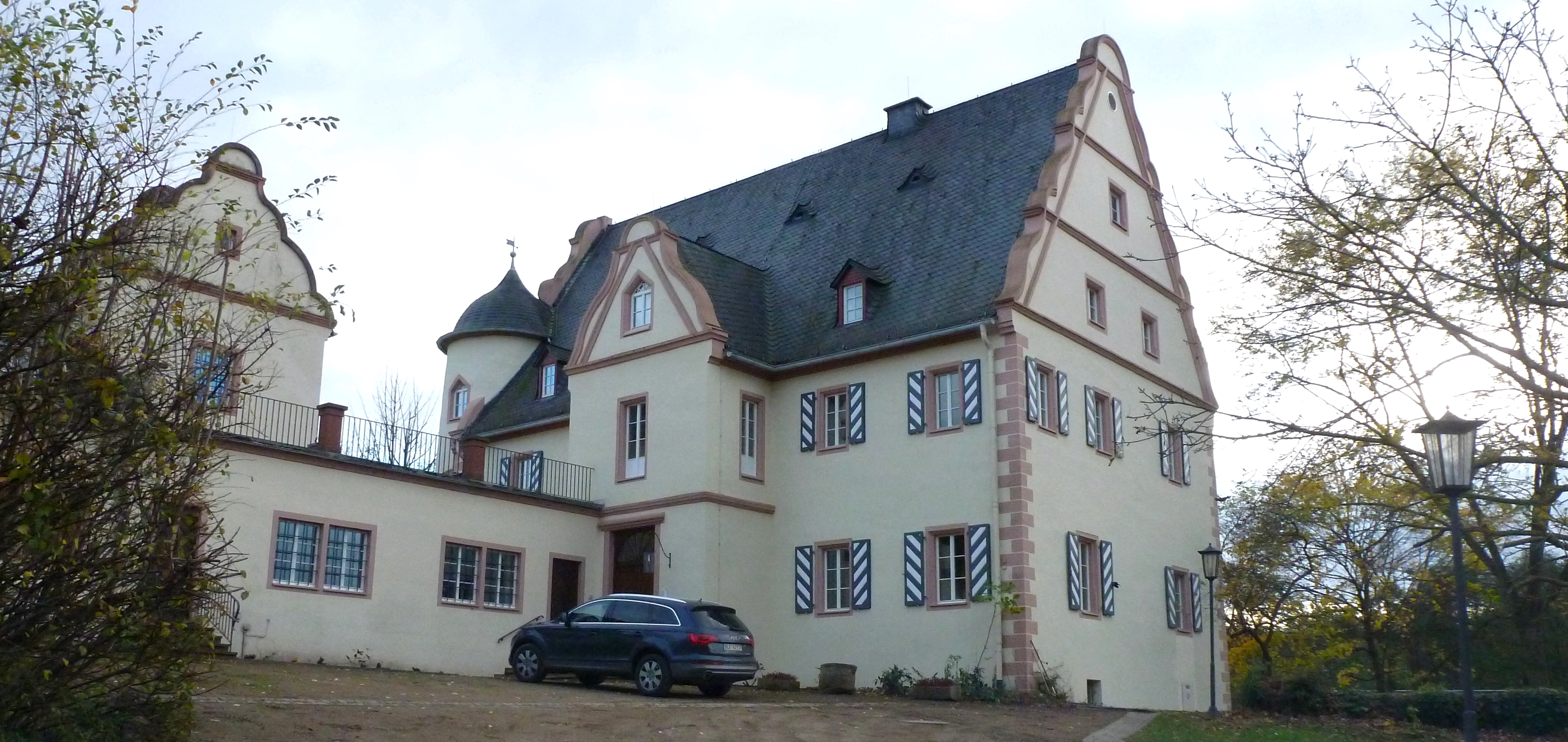
Heidesheim Castle, where Princess Alexandra lived with her first husband Jefferson von Pfeil und Klein-Ellguth

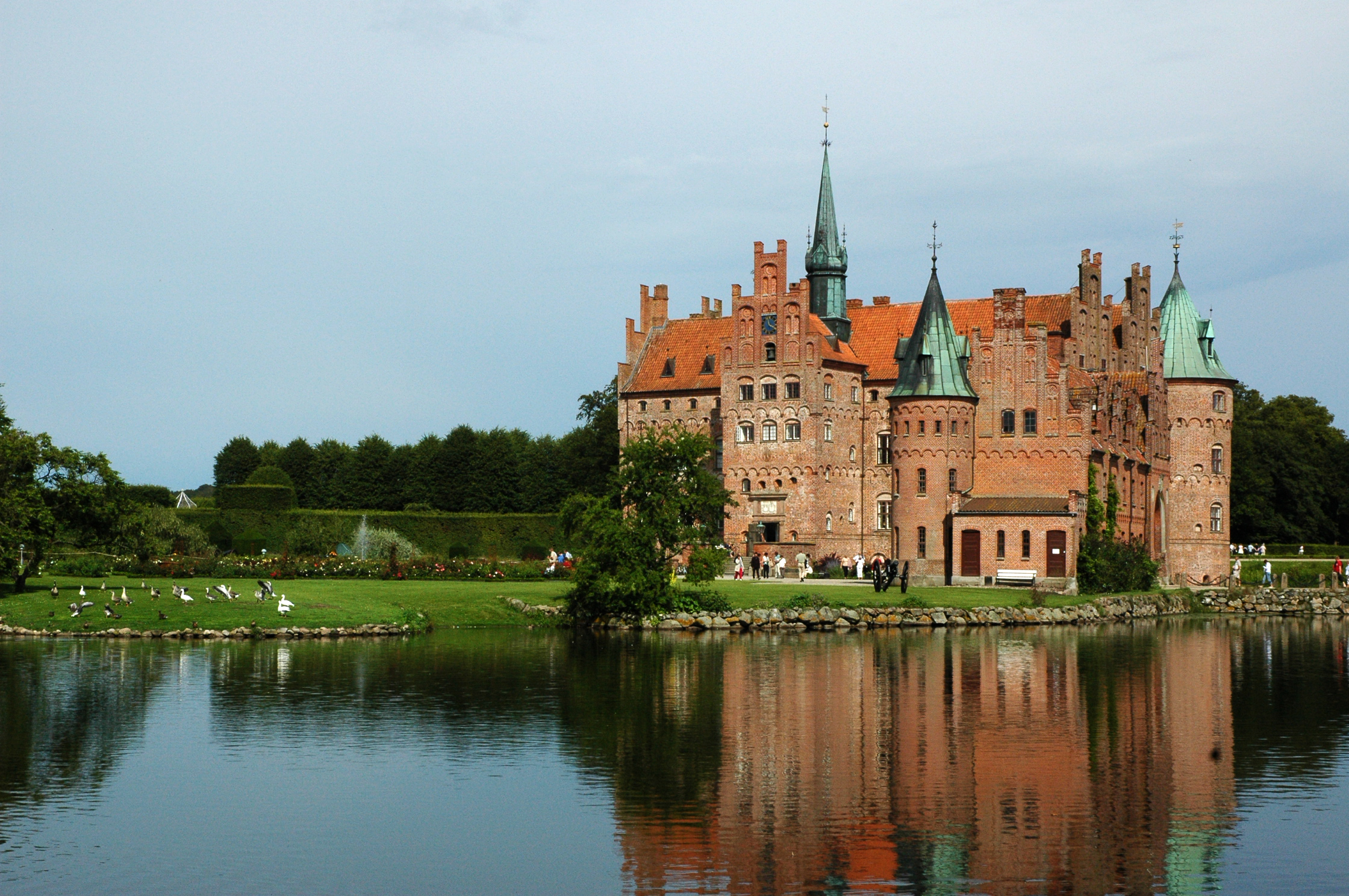
Egeskov Castle, family estate of the Ahlefeldt family, where Princess Alexandra lives with her second husband Michael

Styles of Princess Alexandra of Sayn-Wittgenstein-Berleburg
- Reference style: Her Highness
- Spoken style: Your Highness

Princess Alexandra of Sayn-Wittgenstein-Berleburg, Countess Ahlefeldt-Laurvig-Bille (Alexandra Rosemarie Ingrid Benedikte; born 20 November 1970), is the first daughter and second of three children of Prince Richard of Sayn-Wittgenstein-Berleburg and Princess Benedikte of Denmark, sister of two Queens, Margrethe II and Anne-Marie of Greece. She is the first cousin of King Frederik X of Denmark.

== Succession rights in Denmark ==
Under the succession rules set by King Frederik IX, since Princess Benedikte and her children, Prince Gustav, Princess Nathalie and Princess Alexandra, have not taken up permanent residence in Denmark, they have effectively waived their place in the line of succession to the Danish throne. Since 19 May 1998, Alexandra has been a Danish citizen.

== First marriage and children ==
Alexandra was married on 6 June 1998 at Gråsten Palace to Count Jefferson von Pfeil und Klein-Ellguth. Jefferson and Alexandra are distantly related, both descending from Leopold III, Duke of Anhalt-Dessau. The couple has two children:

- Count Friedrich Richard Oscar Jefferson von Pfeil und Klein-Ellguth (born 14 September 1999 at Rigshospitalet in Copenhagen)
- Countess Ingrid Alexandra Irma Astrid Benedikte von Pfeil und Klein-Ellguth (born 16 August 2003 at Rigshospitalet in Copenhagen)

The family lived in Paris, where Count Jefferson was a managing director of the local branch of the bank Sal. Oppenheim and where she worked at UNESCO's World Heritage Centre. Beginning in 2013, Alexandra and Jefferson lived in Heidesheim Castle, Germany, near Mainz. The couple announced their intention to divorce in May 2017.

== Second marriage ==
On 18 May 2019, Alexandra married Count Michael of Ahlefeldt-Laurvig-Bille at Sankt Jørgens Kirke in Svendborgsund. He is a member of an ancient House of Ahlefeldt of German and Danish descent.

Count Michael Preben is the only son of Count Claus Christian Ahlefeldt-Laurvig-Bille (Copenhagen, 6 March 1932 - 2014), Landlord in Havnø Gods, Hadsund, and his second wife (m. Tranekær Kirke, Tranekær, 21 September 1963, divorced in 1971) Countess Merete-Anette von Lüttichau, née Ahlefeldt-Laurvig (b. Rudkøbing, 1 April 1943), nurse, who was also her husband's third cousin.

She has one sister-in-law, Countess Suzanne Ingrid Jessie Dorthe Ahlefeldt-Laurvig-Bille (b. Svendborg, 4 March 1967), lady-in-waiting to Alexandra, Countess of Frederiksborg, who married her third cousin once removed, Erik Ove Carl John Emil Vind til Sanderumgaard (b. Hellerup, 5 May 1954), the grandson of Prince Erik of Denmark.

They currently live at Egeskov Castle, ancestral home and a country residence of the Counts of Ahlefeldt, which is managed by Count Michael Preben, while Princess Alexandra engages herself in drawing, garden designing and art history.

== Career ==
Princess Alexandra worked for UNESCO World Heritage Centre until 2013, in charge of preserving the cultural heritage of countries in the Middle East and South Asia.
