= Egeskov Castle =

Castle in Funen, Denmark

Coordinates: 55°10′35″N 10°29′22″E

- Egeskov Slot
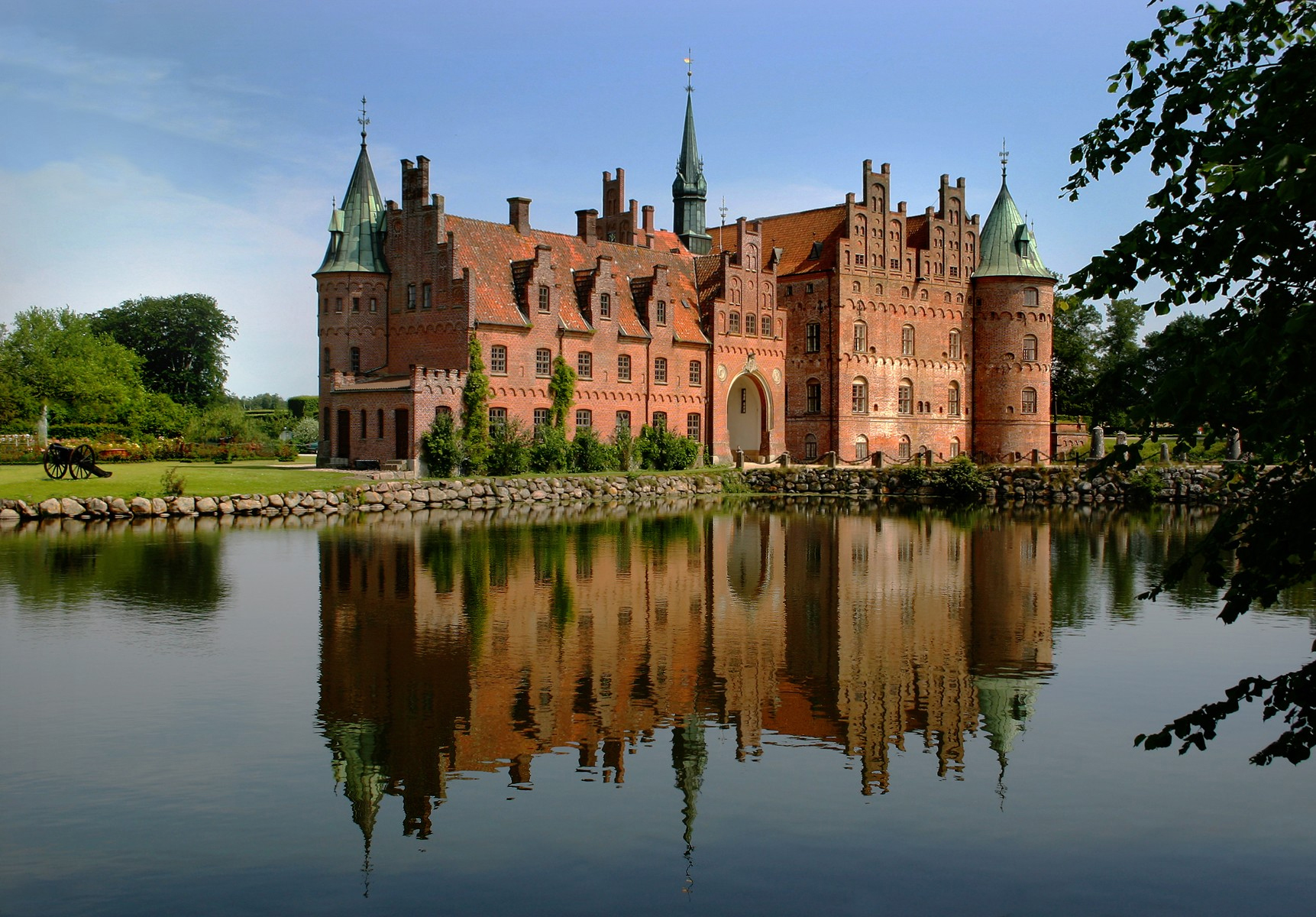
- Interactive map of the Egeskov Castle area

General information
- Type: Water castle
- Location: Denmark
- Completed: 1554

Egeskov Castle (Danish: Egeskov Slot) is located near Kværndrup, in the south of the island of Funen, Denmark. The castle is Denmark’s best preserved Renaissance water castle.

== History ==
Egeskov was first mentioned in 1405. The castle structure was erected by Frands Brockenhuus in 1554.

Due to the troubles caused by the civil war known as the Count's Feud (Danish: Grevens fejde), general civil unrest, and a civil war introducing the Protestant Reformation, most Danish noblemen built their homes as fortifications. The castle is constructed on oaken piles and located in a small lake with a maximum depth of 5 metres (16 ft). Originally, the only access was by means of a drawbridge. According to legend, it took an entire forest of oak trees to build the foundation, hence the name Egeskov (oak forest).

The estate has belonged to the Bille-Brahe family since 1784, when they acquired it from descendants of the Brockenhuus family. In 1882 it was inherited by the counts Ahlefeldt-Laurvig-Bille, who still own it.

== Castle architecture ==
Outside, the castle is a Late Gothic building. Inside the original elements already show Renaissance design.

The castle consists of two long buildings connected by a thick double wall, allowing defenders to abandon one house and continue fighting from the other. The double wall is over one meter thick and contains secret staircases and a well. Defenders were able to attack an enemy's flanks from the two round corner towers. Other medieval defences include artillery ports, scalding holes and arrow slits. The bricks composing the castle are of an oversized medieval type sometimes called "monks bricks". The conical towers are constructed in a series of separate panels.

The architecture includes depressed and round-arched windows, round-arched blank arcading within the gables, and a double string course between the high cellar and the ground floor. The structure contains some of the early indoor plumbing design first used in Europe with vertical shafts for waste. The thick double wall also contains a water well which is accessed from the servants kitchen in the east house. Several of the large rooms have massive parallel exposed beams with some end carving.

== Castle contents ==
Contents of the castle include a massive iron chest from at least as early as the 16th century, which derived from Hvedholm Castle, a property earlier owned by the Egeskov estate about twenty kilometers to the west.

Numerous oil paintings are found within the castle including a large painting in the great hall on the first floor of Niels Juel, who defeated the Swedish force in the Battle of Køge Bay in the year 1677.

== Gardens and lands ==
Other buildings belonging to Egeskov include Ladegården, a thatched half-timbered building which is now part of the museum. Other buildings are used by the museum and for farming. Surrounding the castle is an old park, covering 20 hectares (49 acres) of land. The park is divided into a number of gardens. The renaissance garden features fountains, a gravel path and topiary figures. The fuchsia garden, one of the largest in Europe, contains 104 different species. Other gardens near the castle include an English garden, a water garden, an herb garden, a vegetable garden, and a peasant's garden (bondehave). The gardens also feature four hedge mazes. The oldest is a beech maze several hundreds of years old. This garden is trimmed every year to prevent the trees from dying. The newest maze is the world's largest bamboo maze. It features a Chinese tower in the centre, and a bridge from the tower provides the exit from the maze. The parks feature a three-meter-tall sundial designed by Danish poet and mathematician, Piet Hein.

The land surrounding the castle also includes a number of playgrounds and children's play structures.

The estate includes an additional eight square kilometres; 2.5 square kilometres (0.97 sq mi) is forest, with the rest being farmland. In 1986, a full-sized replica of the castle was built in Hokkaidō, Japan, to hold an aquarium. This was constructed with the permission of the Egeskov's owners at the time, Count Claus and Countess Louisa Ahlefeldt-Laurvig-Bille.

== Museums ==
Egeskov is home to the following museums.

- A vintage automobile collection
- A vintage motorcycle collection
- A collection describing the history of agriculture
- A collection of flying vehicles
- A collection of Falck and other emergency vehicles

Most of the castle is open to the public, except for the areas used by Count Michael Ahlefeldt-Laurvig-Bille. The museum of agriculture and the horse wagon collection is located in the building Ladegård mentioned previously.

Three large modern buildings are occupied by the vintage automobile collection, the vintage motorcycle collection, the Falck collection, and by a collection of airplanes and helicopters. The Falck collection is a collection of vehicles from the Danish rescue company, Falck, emergency vehicles such as fire trucks, ambulances, rescue boats, and other assorted emergency vehicles.

== List of owners ==
From	To	Owner
c. 1405		Lydike and Jørgen Skinkel
c. 1470		Johan Sinkel
1516		Otto and Poul Skinkel
1518	1533	Laurids Skinkel
1533	1536	Hilleborg Pedersdatter Bille and her daughters Anne, Hilleborg and Rigborg
1536	1545	Anne, Hilleborg and Rigborg
1545	1569	Frands Brockenhuus
1569	1604	Laurids Brockenhuus
1604	1615	Laurids Brockenhuus's heirs
1615	1615	Hans Pogwish
1616	1630	Jacob Ulfeldt
1630	1640	The children of Jacob Ulfeldt
1640	1648	Laurids Ulfeldt
1648	1656	Oluf Parsberg
1656	1666	Otto Krag
1666	1688	Anna Rosenkrantz
1688	1713	Niels Krag the Elder
1713	1722	The widow of Niels Krag
1722	1740	Niels Krag the Younger
1740	1784	Sofie Juel
1784	1789	Henrik Bille-Brahe
1789	1810	Car. Agnese Raben
1810	1857	Preben Bille-Brahe
1857	1871	Fr. Siegfried Bille-Brahe
1871	1882	Frantz Preben Bille-Brahe
1882	1912	Jul. Ahlefeldt-Laurvig-Bille
1912	1919	C. Jessy Bille-Brahe
1919	1946	Fr. Pr. Ahlefeldt-Laurvig-Bille
1946	1985	Gregers and Nonni Ahlefeldt-Laurvig-Bille
1985	1994	Claus and Louisa Ahlefeldt-Laurvig-Bille
1994 —		Michael Ahlefeldt-Laurvig-Bille

== Gallery ==
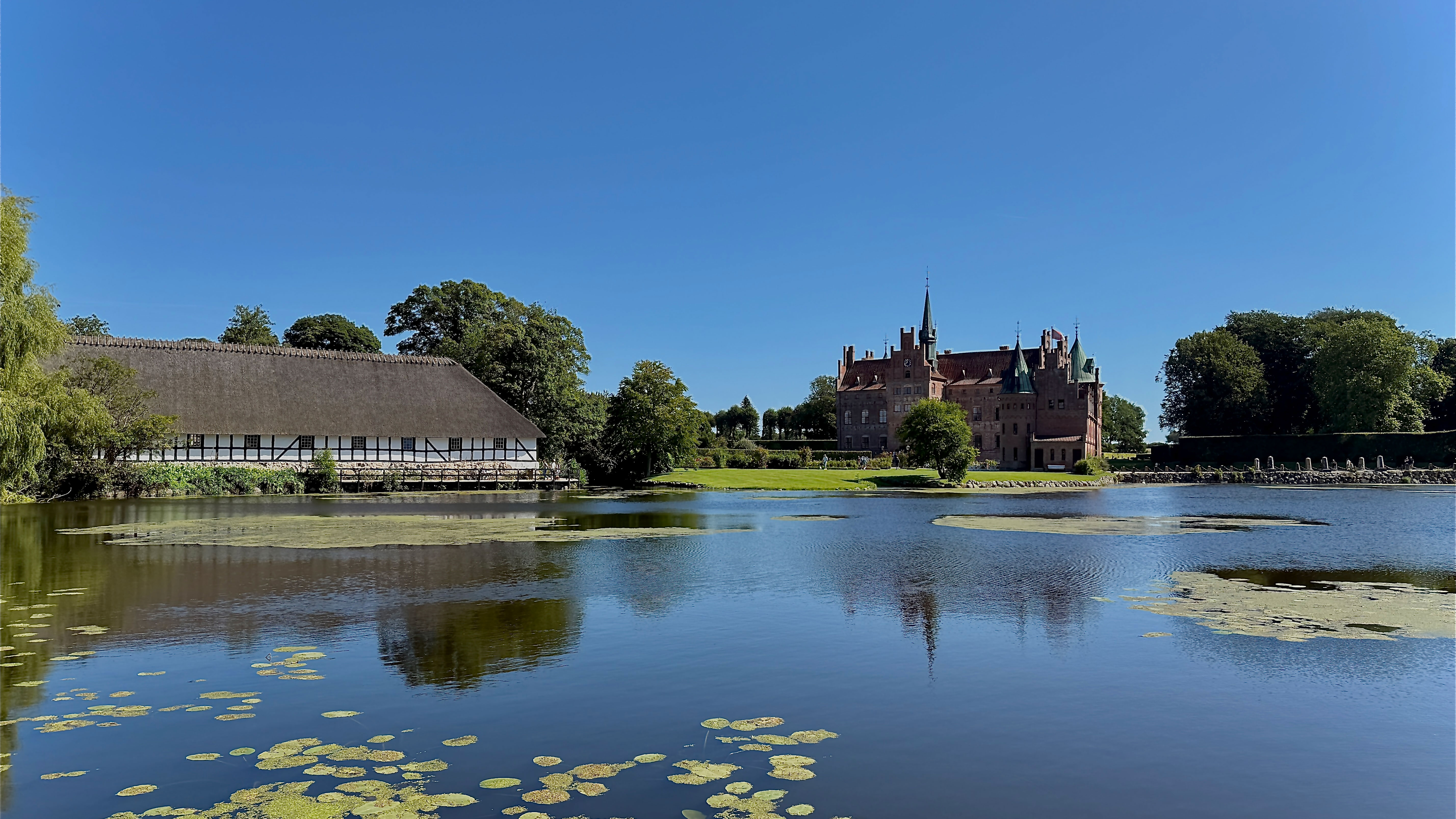
Slot Egeskov

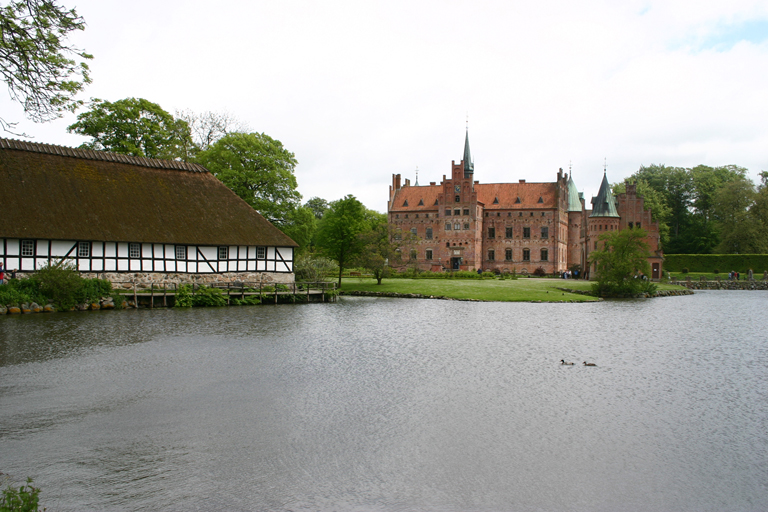
Exterior view

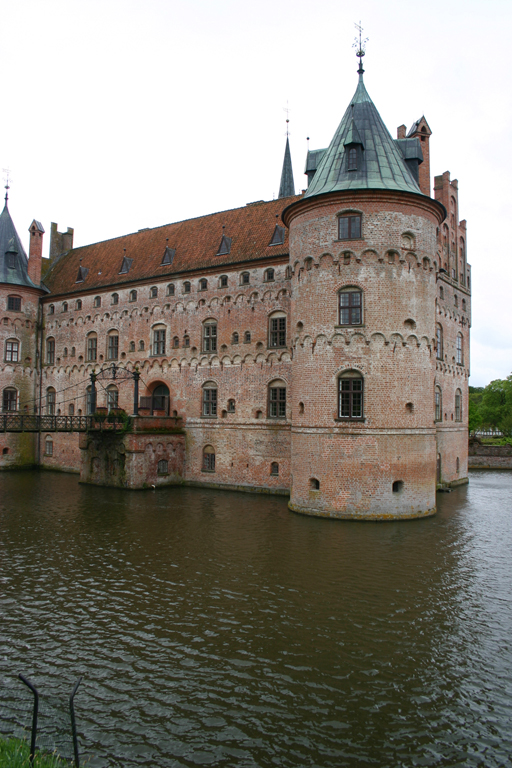
Exterior view

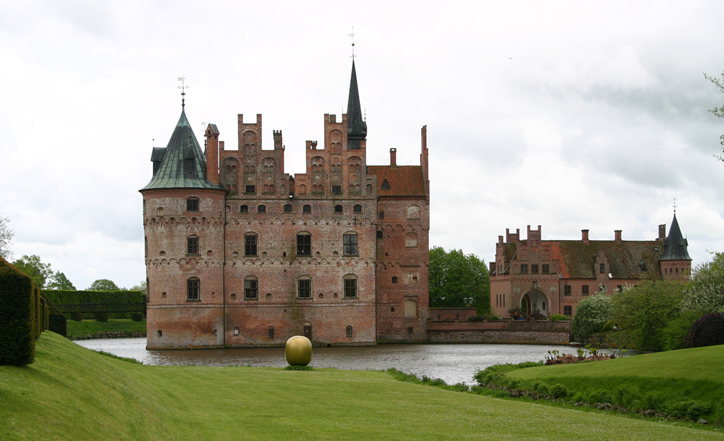
Exterior view

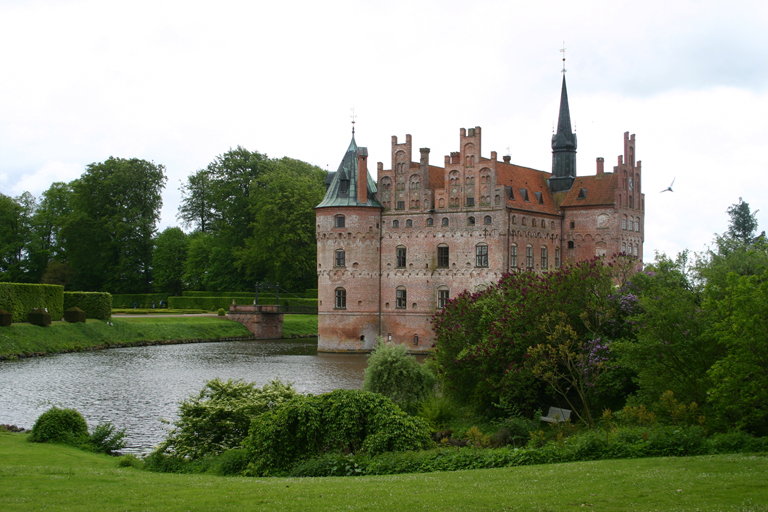
Exterior view

== See also ==
- Horne Church
- List of castles and palaces in Denmark
- Medieval warfare
- Siegecraft

== Literature ==
- Lassen, Erik; Espen-Hansen, Inge (1982) [1963]. Egeskov: The History of the Estate : the Architecture of the Building : Egeskov Park and Gardens. Egeskov.
