= Ingrid of Sweden =

Queen of Denmark from 1947 to 1972

Ingrid
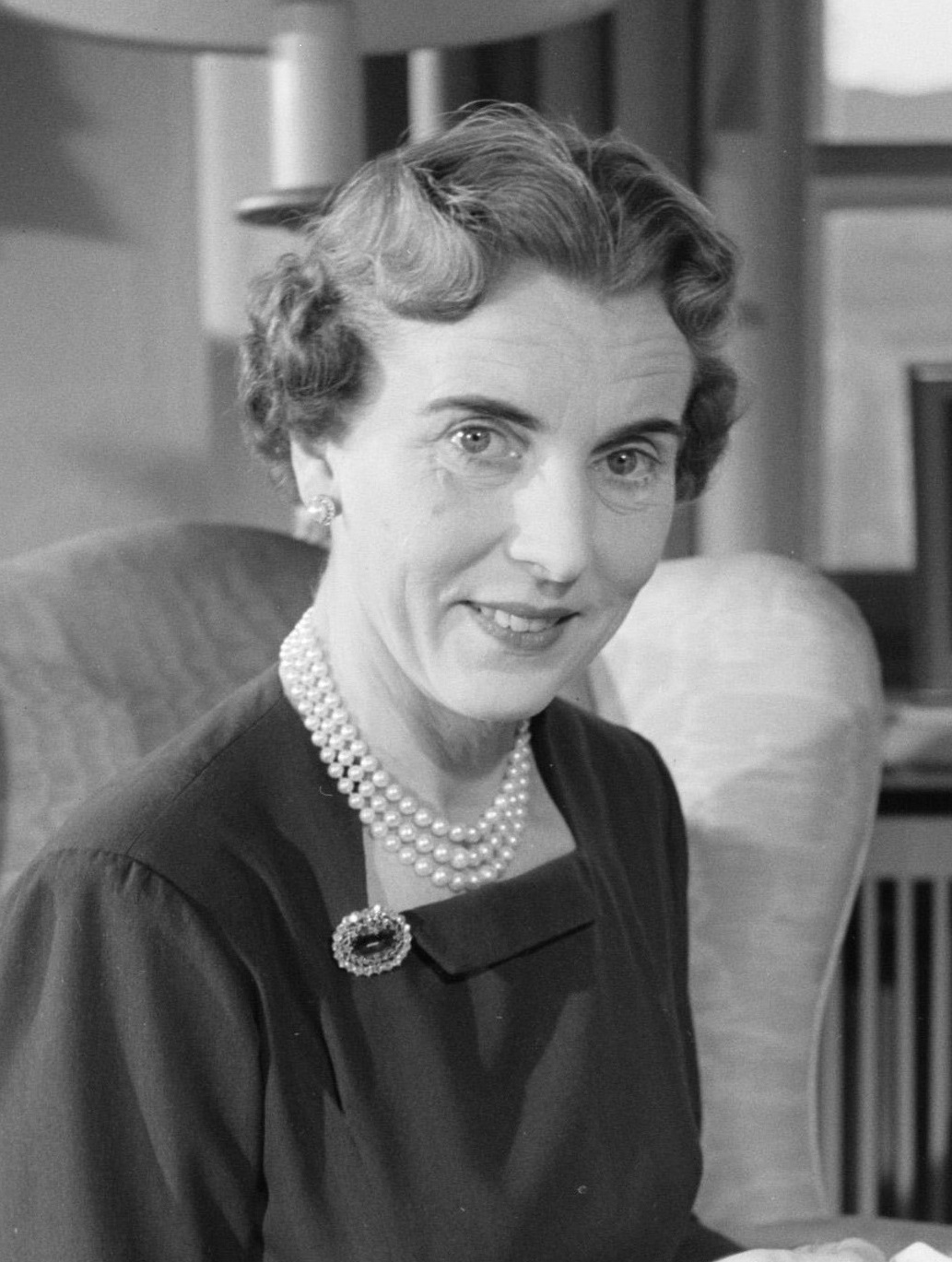
- Ingrid in 1954

Queen consort of Denmark
- Tenure: 20 April 1947 – 14 January 1972
- Born: 28 March 1910; Stockholm Palace, Stockholm, Sweden
- Died: 7 November 2000 (aged 90); Fredensborg Palace, Fredensborg, Denmark
- Burial: 14 November 2000; Roskilde Cathedral, Roskilde, Denmark
- Spouse: Frederick IX of Denmark (m. 1935; died 1972)
- Issue: Margrethe II of Denmark; Benedikte, Princess of Sayn-Wittgenstein-Berleburg; Anne-Marie, Queen of Greece
Names
- Ingrid Victoria Sofia Louisa Margareta
- House: Bernadotte
- Father: Gustaf VI Adolf of Sweden
- Mother: Margaret of Connaught

Ingrid (Ingrid Victoria Sofia Louisa Margareta; 28 March 1910 – 7 November 2000) was Queen of Denmark from 20 April 1947 to 14 January 1972 as the wife of King Frederik IX.

Ingrid was born into the House of Bernadotte as the only daughter of Crown Prince Gustaf Adolf of Sweden (later King Gustaf VI Adolf) and his first wife, Princess Margaret of Connaught. In 1935, she married Frederik, then Crown Prince of Denmark. The couple had three daughters: Margrethe, Benedikte, and Anne-Marie.

In 1947, Frederik became king upon the death of his father, King Christian X, and Ingrid became queen consort. As queen, Ingrid reformed the traditions of Danish court life, abolished many old-fashioned customs at court and created a more relaxed atmosphere at official receptions. In 1972, Frederik died and was succeeded by his and Ingrid's eldest daughter, Margrethe II. Ingrid died in 2000.

== Early life ==
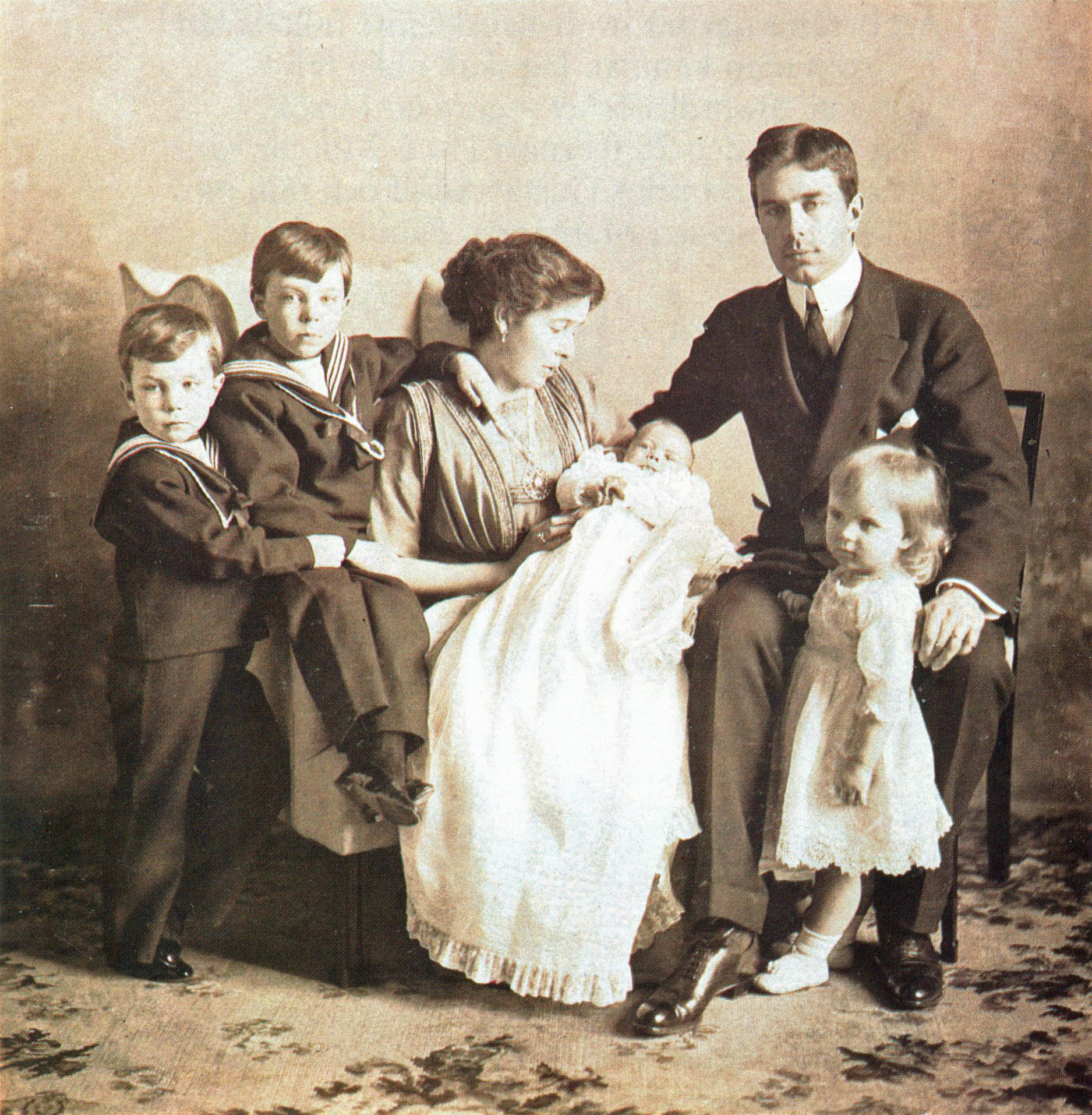
Princess Ingrid (far right) with her father, mother and three brothers in 1912.

Ingrid was born on 28 March 1910, at the Royal Palace in Stockholm as the third child and the only daughter of Gustaf Adolf, Crown Prince of Sweden and his first wife, Princess Margaret of Connaught. Her mother was a daughter of Queen Victoria's third son Prince Arthur, Duke of Connaught and Strathearn by his wife Princess Louise Margaret of Prussia.

She was baptised Ingrid Victoria Sofia Louisa Margareta in Slottskyrkan (the Royal Chapel) in Stockholm, Sweden on 5 May 1910. Her godparents were: the King and Queen of Sweden (her paternal grandparents); the Dowager Queen of Sweden (her paternal great-grandmother); the Duke and Duchess of Connaught and Strathearn (her maternal grandparents); the Dowager Grand Duchess of Baden (her paternal great-grandmother); the Empress of Russia (her mother's paternal first cousin); Princess Alexander of Teck (her mother's paternal first cousin); the Prince of Wales (her mother's paternal first cousin); Prince Adalbert of Prussia (her maternal second cousin); the Grand Duchess of Baden (her grandaunt); and the Dowager Duchess of Dalarna (her great-grandaunt).

Ingrid and her family lived in apartments in the Royal Palace in Stockholm, in a mansion at Ulriksdal, near the capital, and in a summer residence, Sofiero Palace in Helsingborg, Scania in southern Sweden. Crown Princess Margaret founded a school for Ingrid with a small circle of Swedish noble girls. Ingrid was also given some domestic instruction as part of her education. As a child, she practiced cooking in her model cottage on the palace grounds and even washed the dishes after meals. In 1920, when Ingrid was just ten years old, her mother died from sepsis while in the eighth month of her sixth pregnancy. After her mother's death, Ingrid spent several months of each year in the United Kingdom in the care of her grandfather. Observers suggested that Ingrid's strong self-discipline was shaped as an effect of her mother's death. Her father remarried Lady Louise Mountbatten three years later. Louise was a second cousin of Ingrid's. Only a stillborn daughter resulted from her father's second marriage. Ingrid felt betrayed by her father when he remarried, and she was unkind to Crown Princess Louise. Ingrid and her father would not reconcile until many years later.

Ingrid was taught history, art history, political science, and learned several languages. Her knowledge of art and culture was extended by long stays in Paris and Rome. Along with her father, stepmother and brother Prince Bertil, Ingrid took a five-month journey through the Middle East between 1934 and 1935. She was interested in sports, especially horse-riding, skiing and tennis. Ingrid made her debut at the opening of the Swedish Riksdag in 1928 when she was noted to be "smartly dressed". She was also noted to be an accomplished linguist, horsewoman, skier, skater and dancer. She often played tennis against her grandfather King Gustav V. During her young adulthood, Ingrid was often seen driving her two-seat car around Stockholm. Besides gaining a reputation as a stylish young woman, she was known as being quite attractive. After her visit to the United States in 1939, Americans described her as "tall and very slender" with a "nicely modeled mouth and exquisite teeth".

== Marriage ==
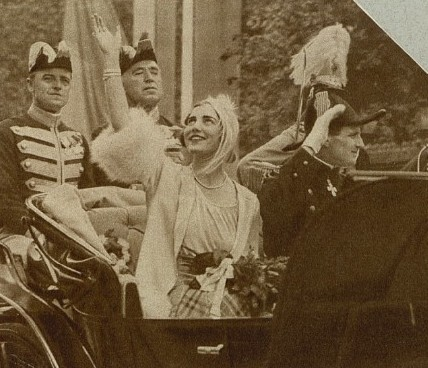
The newly married royal couple at their arrival in Copenhagen in 1935

The question of Ingrid's marriage was a hot topic of conversation in the 1920s. She was matched with various foreign royalties and was seen by some as a possible wife for the heir apparent to the British throne, the Prince of Wales, who was her second cousin. Her mother, Margaret of Connaught, and the then-Prince of Wales' father, King George V, were first cousins, both being grandchildren of Queen Victoria. In 1928, Ingrid met the Prince of Wales in London. However, no engagement took place. She was also considered as a match for Prince George of the United Kingdom, the fourth son of King George V.

On 15 March 1935, shortly before her 25th birthday, her engagement to Frederik, the Crown Prince of Denmark and Iceland, who was 11 years her senior, was announced. They had gotten engaged in private in the beginning of February. They were related in several ways. As descendants of Oscar I of Sweden, they were third cousins. Through Leopold, Grand Duke of Baden, they were third cousins. And finally through Paul I of Russia, Frederik was a fourth cousin of Ingrid's mother.

The couple was married in Stockholm Cathedral on 24 May 1935 by the Archbishop of Uppsala, Erling Eidem. Ingrid wore the veil of Irish lace her late mother, Princess Margaret of Connaught, had worn at her wedding 30 years earlier. The veil has since been worn by all of Ingrid's female descendants as well as her granddaughter-in-law Mary Donaldson. She wore a crown of myrtle from a shrub her mother had brought with her from Osborne House in England to Sofiero Palace in Sweden. Carrying a sprig of myrtle in the wedding bouquet is a tradition that maintains to this day in the Swedish royal family and, with Ingrid, has continued into the Danish royal family when she brought cuttings from the shrub at Sofiero to be planted at Fredensborg Palace. Ingrid's second cousins Princess Ragnhild and Princess Astrid of Norway served as bridesmaids while Count Gustaf Bernadotte of Wisborg, son of Folke Bernadotte, was a page boy.

Among the guests at the wedding were Frederik's parents, King Christian X and Queen Alexandrine of Denmark; Ingrid's father and stepmother, Crown Prince Gustaf Adolf and Crown Princess Louise of Sweden; and Ingrid's grandparents, King Gustaf V of Sweden and the Duke of Connaught and Stathearn; as well as The King and Queen of the Belgians and The Crown Prince and Crown Princess of Norway.

The Swedish royal barge Vasaorden transported the couple to Dannebrog, the Danish royal yacht, on 24 May. Two days later, they arrived in Copenhagen aboard the yacht before leaving for a honeymoon to Rome. Her wedding was one of the greatest media events of the day in Sweden in 1935, and received so much attention that the media were criticised for it. Ingrid also appeared on the radio in 1935 and read a poem, something that was also given much attention.

== Crown Princess ==
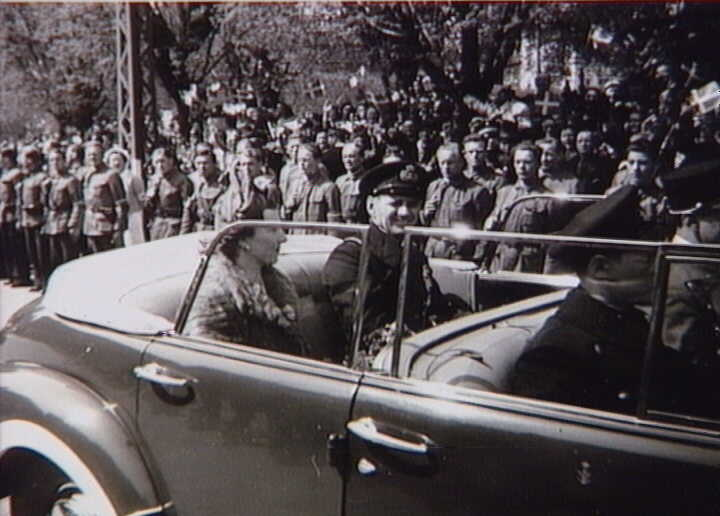
Crown Prince Frederik and Crown Princess Ingrid on 9 May 1945, leaving Christiansborg Palace in Copenhagen after the first opening of Parliament following the end of Nazi Germany's occupation of Denmark.

While she was Crown Princess, she was the official patron of the Girl Guides (1936), after having taken, and passed, the same tests all applicants were given. In 1940, before the occupation, she was the leader of the Danske Kvinders Beredskab (The Danish Women's war-effort society). During the German occupation of Denmark in World War II, Ingrid, with her personal courage and integrity, influenced the Danish Royal House and its conduct in relation to the occupation forces, and won great popularity as a symbol of silent resistance and public patriotic morale. She showed solidarity toward the Danish population, and could often be seen on her bicycle or with her baby carriage on the streets of Copenhagen during the war. Her open defiance of the occupation forces made her grandfather, King Gustav of Sweden, worry about the risks, and in 1941, he sent a demand to her to be more discreet "for the sake of the dynasty" and its safety, but she reacted with anger and refused to obey, and she had the support of her spouse, who shared her views. One display of defiance shown by Ingrid was her positioning of the flags of Denmark, Sweden and the United Kingdom in the window of the nursery at Amalienborg, the royal residence in the centre of Copenhagen.

== Queen consort ==
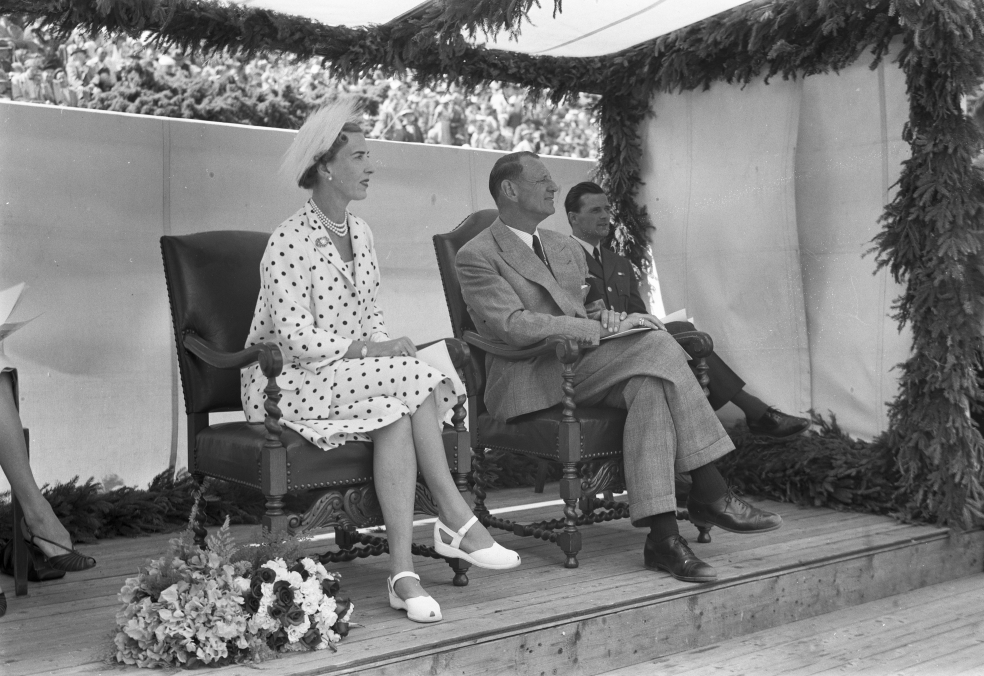
King Frederik IX and Queen Ingrid in the 1950s

Upon her husband's accession to the throne on 20 April 1947, she became the Queen of Denmark. As such, she reformed the traditions of Danish court life, abolished many old-fashioned customs at court and created a more relaxed atmosphere at official receptions. She was interested in gardening and art, and renovated the Gråsten Slot according to her own historical research about the palace's original appearance.

== Widowed queen ==
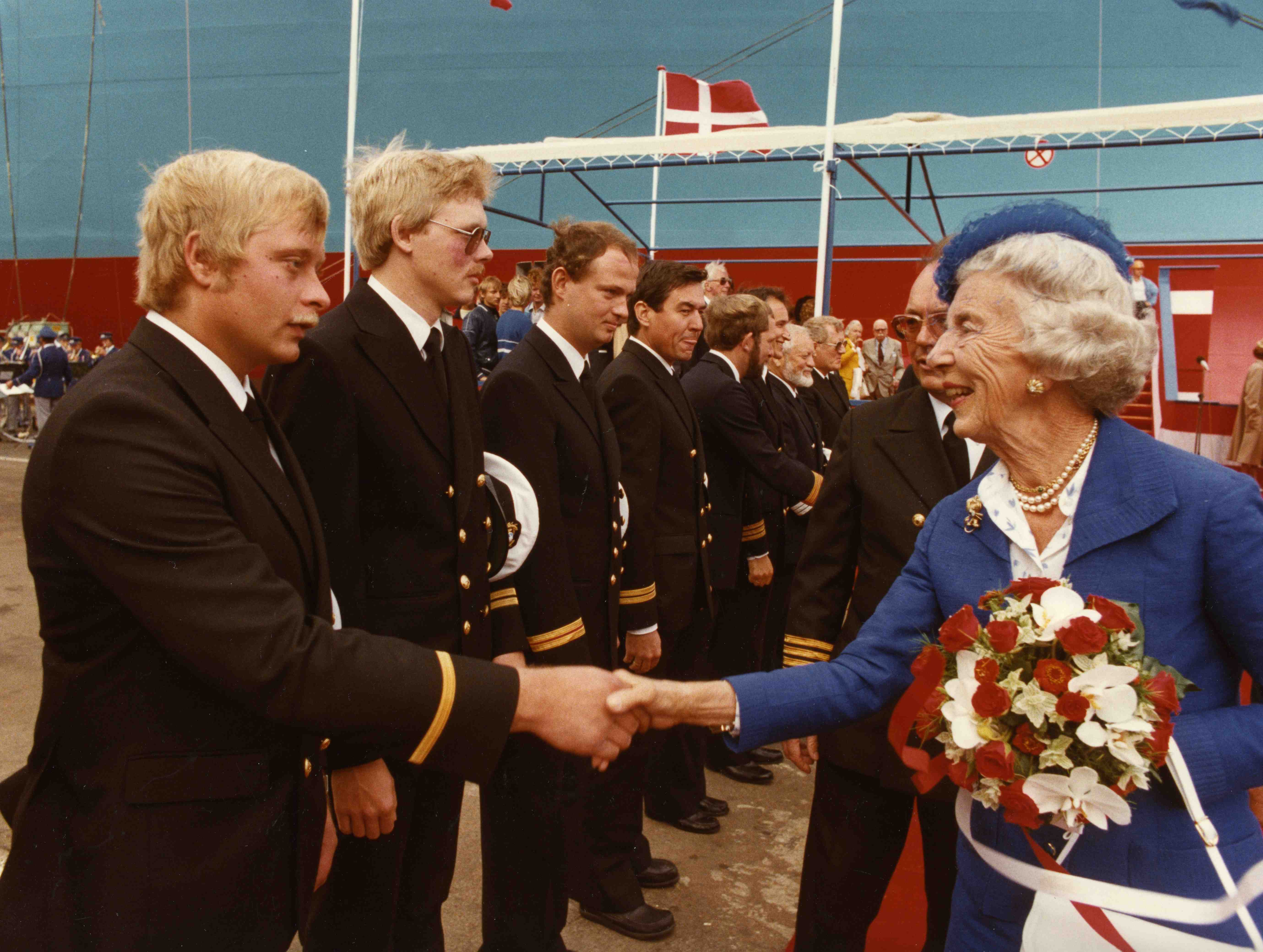
Ingrid at a ship christening in 1983

In 1972, King Frederik IX died, and Ingrid was widowed at the age of 61. Her elder daughter, aged 31, became the new queen, and Ingrid now assumed a position as family matriarch. That same year, after having sworn to respect the Danish constitution, she was appointed Rigsforstander (formal regent) and representative of the monarch whenever her daughter (and later her grandsons) were absent, a task she performed on many occasions. This was exceptional; previously, only the Crown Prince had been allowed to act as regent in the absence of the monarch.

She was patron of a long line of social organizations, positions which, one after another, she eventually left to Princess Benedikte as years passed: Røde Kors, Ældre Sagen, Red Barnet, Løgum Klosters Refugium, and Fonden for Træer og Miljø. She also founded the organizations Kong Frederik og Dronning Ingrids fond til humanitære og kulturelle formål, Ingridfondet for South Jutland, Det kgl. Grønlandsfond, and Dronning Ingrids Romerske Fond til støtte af kulturelle og videnskabelige formål. She was described as dutiful, well-prepared and energetic.

== Death ==
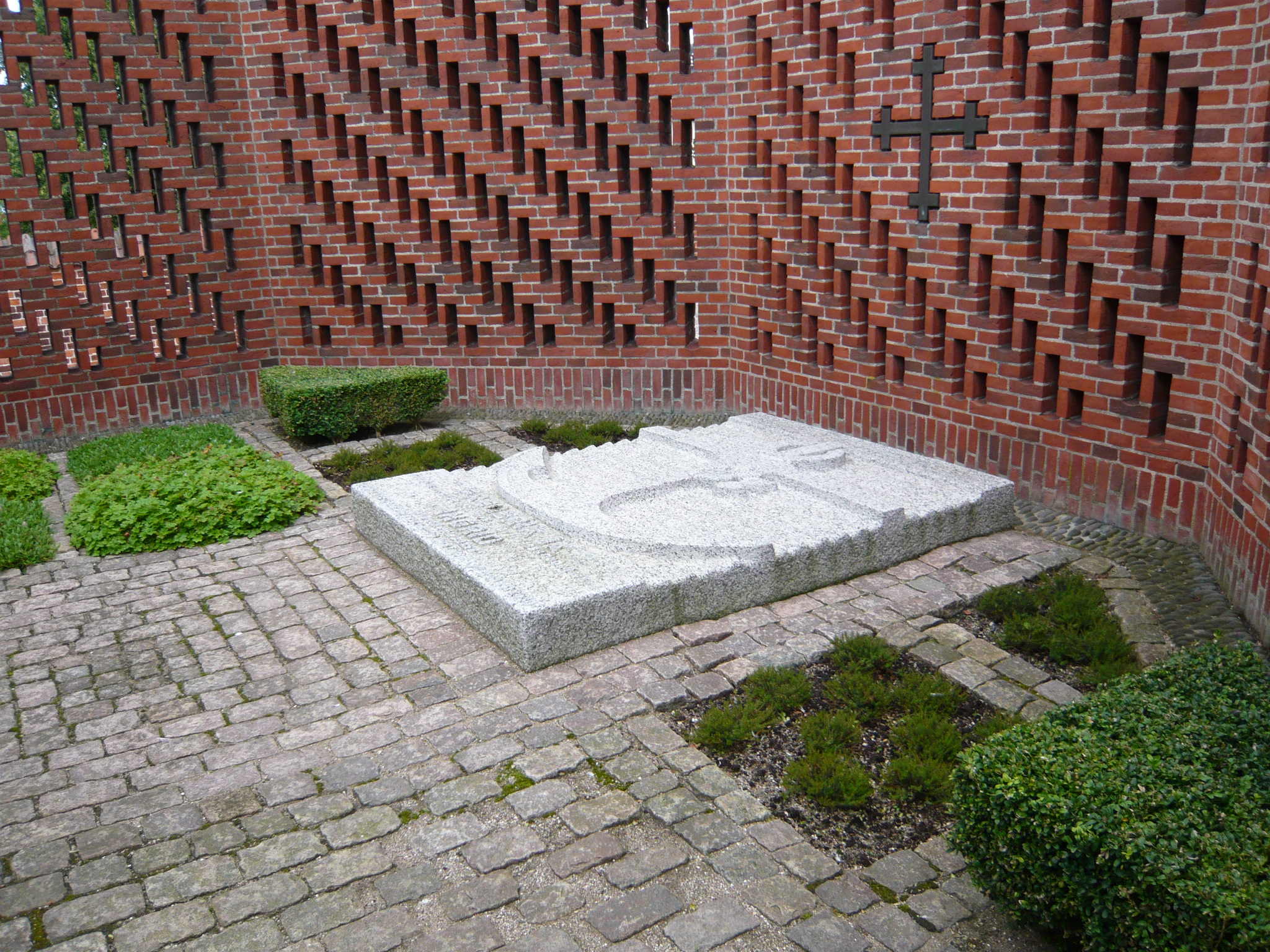
The grave of King Frederik IX and Queen Ingrid at Roskilde

Queen Ingrid died at 4:27 p.m. on 7 November 2000 at Fredensborg Palace, Fredensborg, with her three daughters—Queen Margrethe II, Princess Benedikte and Queen Anne-Marie of Greece—and ten grandchildren at her bedside. She was 90 years old. Thousands gathered outside Amalienborg Palace, her official residence, after her death was announced; flowers were left, candles were lit and hymns were sung in her honour. Her funeral took place on 14 November 2000, and Ingrid was interred next to her husband, King Frederik IX, outside Roskilde Cathedral near Copenhagen. The funeral was attended by many crowned heads of Europe and other heads of state, among them King Carl XVI Gustaf and Queen Silvia of Sweden, Queen Sofía of Spain, Queen Beatrix of the Netherlands, King Harald V and Queen Sonja of Norway, King Albert II and Queen Paola of Belgium, Grand Duke Jean and Grand Duchess Joséphine Charlotte of Luxembourg, Charles, Prince of Wales, Hereditary Prince Albert of Monaco, President of Iceland Ólafur Ragnar Grímsson and former President of Finland Mauno Koivisto.

== Issue ==
Queen Ingrid and King Frederik IX had three daughters:

- Margrethe II of Denmark (born 16 April 1940), married Henri de Laborde de Monpezat on 10 June 1967.
- Princess Benedikte of Denmark (born 29 April 1944), married Prince Richard of Sayn-Wittgenstein-Berleburg on 3 February 1968.
- Queen Anne-Marie of Greece (born 30 August 1946), married King Constantine II of Greece on 18 September 1964.

== Honours ==
Personal Standard of Queen Ingrid, introduced in 1948 and used until her death in 2000.

=== National ===
- Sweden: Member Grand Cross of the Royal Order of the Seraphim (LoK av KMO)
- Sweden: Member of the Royal Family Order of King Gustav V
- Sweden: Member of the Royal Family Order of King Gustav VI Adolf
- Sweden: Member of the Royal Family Order of King Carl XVI Gustaf
- Sweden: Recipient of 50th Birthday Badge Medal of King Carl XVI Gustaf
- Sweden: Recipient of 90th Birthday Badge Medal of King Gustav V
- Denmark: Knight Grand Cross with Collar of the Order of the Elephant (R.E.)
- Denmark: Knight Grand Commander of the Order of the Dannebrog (S.Kmd.)
- Denmark: Dame of the Royal Family Order of King Christian X
- Denmark: Dame of the Royal Family Order of King Frederik IX
- Denmark: Recipient of the Danish Red Cross Badge of Honor (D.r.K.H.)
- Denmark: Recipient of the Medal of the 100th Anniversary of the Birth of King Frederik IX
- Denmark: Recipient of the Silver Jubilee Medal of Queen Margrethe II
- Denmark: Recipient of the Silver Anniversary Medal of Queen Margrethe II and Prince Henrik
- Denmark: Recipient of the 50th Birthday Medal of Queen Margrethe II
- Denmark: Recipient of the King Christian X Memorial Medal

=== Foreign ===
- Austria: Grand Cross, 1st Class of the Order of Honour for Services to the Republic of Austria
- Belgium: Dame Grand Cross of the Order of Leopold I
- (Kingdom of Egypt) Egyptian Royal Family: Dame Grand Cross of the Order of the Virtues, Supreme Class
- (Ethiopia) Ethiopian Imperial Family: Dame Grand Officer of the Order of the Queen of Sheba
- Finland: Grand Cross with Collar of the Order of the White Rose of Finland
- France: Grand Cross of the Legion of Honour
- (Greece) Greek Royal Family: Dame Grand Cross of the Order of Saints Olga and Sophia
- Germany: Grand Cross, Special Class of the Order of Merit of the Federal Republic of Germany
- Iceland: Grand Cross of the Order of the Falcon
- (Iran) Iranian Imperial Family:
  - Dame Grand Cordon, Special Class of the Imperial Order of the Pleiades
  - Recipient of the Commemorative Medal of the 2,500 year Celebration of the Persian Empire
- Italy: Grand Cross of the Order of Merit of the Italian Republic
- Holy See: Recipient of the For Church and Pope Badge Medal
- Luxembourg: Dame Grand Cross of the Order of Adolphe of Nassau
- Netherlands: Dame Grand Cross of the Order of the Netherlands Lion
- Norway: Dame Grand Cross of the Order of St. Olav
- Spain: Dame Grand Cross of the Order of Isabella the Catholic
- Thailand: Knight of the Order of the Royal House of Chakri
- (Kingdom of Tunisia) Tunisian Royal Family: Dame Grand Cross of the Order of the Fundamental Pact
- United Kingdom: Recipient of the King George VI Coronation Medal

== Arms ==
Marital arms of Queen Ingrid of Denmark

Royal Monogram of Queen Ingrid of Denmark

Queen Ingrid's Arms as displayed
in the Frederiksborg Castle in Hillerød

== Ancestry ==
Ancestors of Ingrid of Sweden

8. Oscar II of Sweden
4. Gustaf V of Sweden
9. Princess Sophia of Nassau
2. Gustaf VI Adolf of Sweden
10. Frederick I, Grand Duke of Baden
5. Princess Victoria of Baden
11. Princess Louise of Prussia
1. Princess Ingrid of Sweden
12. Prince Albert of Saxe-Coburg and Gotha
6. Prince Arthur, Duke of Connaught and Strathearn
13. Queen Victoria of the United Kingdom
3. Princess Margaret of Connaught
14. Prince Friedrich Karl of Prussia
7. Princess Louise Margaret of Prussia
15. Princess Maria Anna of Anhalt-Dessau

Ingrid of Sweden House of Bernadotte Born: 28 March 1910 Died: 7 November 2000
Danish royalty
Preceded by Alexandrine of Mecklenburg-Schwerin	Queen consort of Denmark; 1947–1972	Succeeded by Henri Laborde de Monpezat as prince consort
