= Princess Nathalie of Sayn-Wittgenstein-Berleburg =

Danish royalty and equestrian

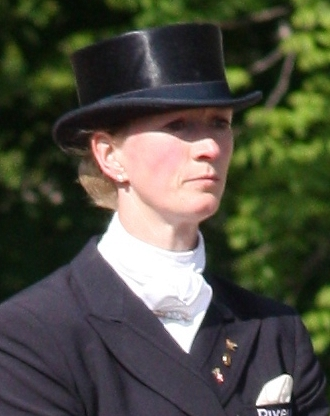
- Nathalie in 2013
- Born: 2 May 1975 (age 51); Copenhagen, Denmark
- Spouse: Alexander Johannsmann (m. 2010; div. 2022)
- Issue: Konstantin Johannsmann; Louisa Johannsmann
Names
- Nathalie Xenia Margrethe Benedikte
- House: Sayn-Wittgenstein-Berleburg
- Father: Richard, 6th Prince of Sayn-Wittgenstein-Berleburg
- Mother: Princess Benedikte of Denmark

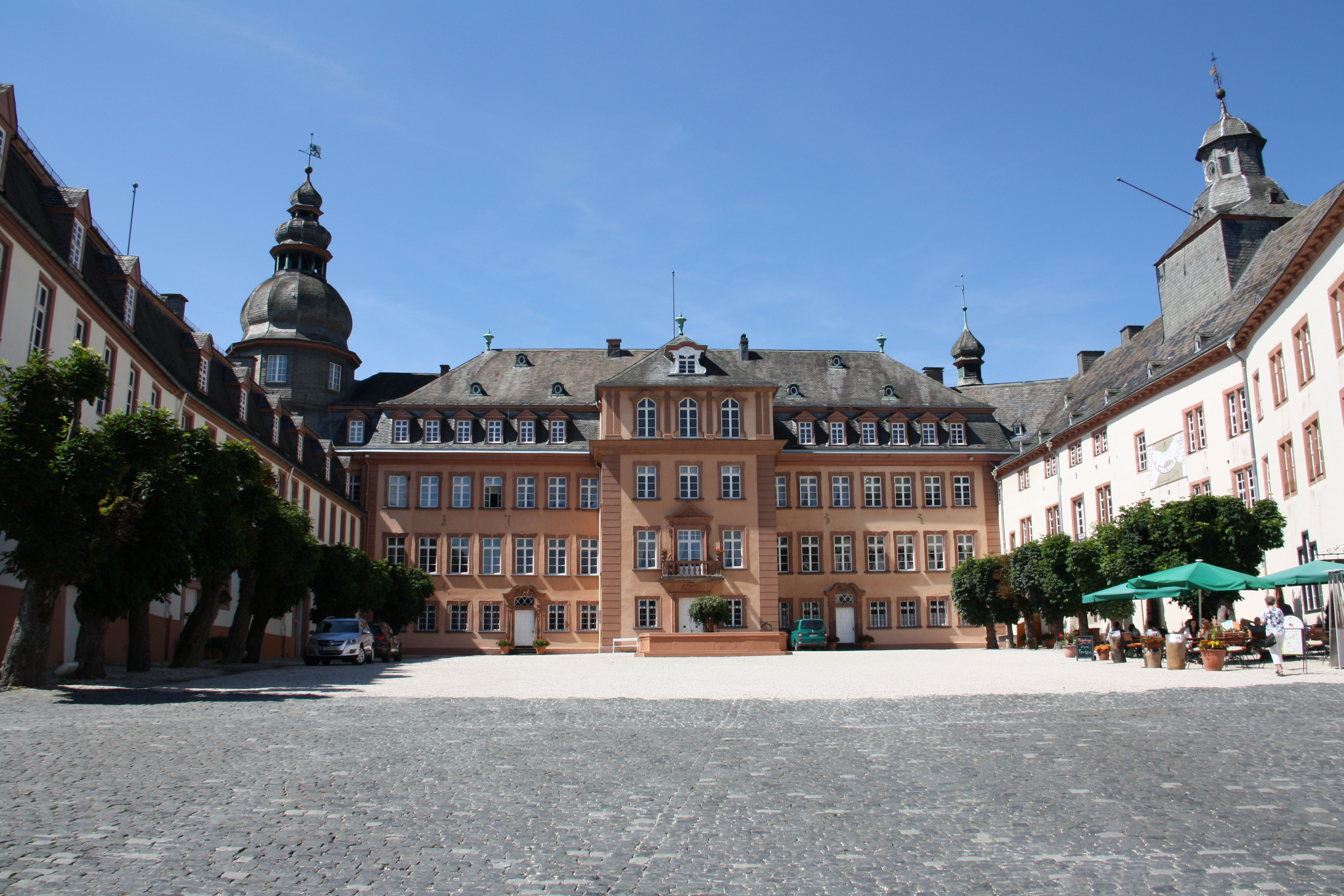
Schloss Berleburg, Bad Berleburg

Princess Nathalie of Sayn-Wittgenstein-Berleburg (Nathalie Xenia Margrethe Benedikte; born 2 May 1975) is a Danish equestrian, an Olympian, and the daughter of Princess Benedikte of Denmark and Prince Richard of Sayn-Wittgenstein-Berleburg. She is the niece of Queen Margrethe II of Denmark and King Constantine II of Greece. Her first cousin is King Frederik X of Denmark.

A member of the Danish dressage team, she won bronze at the 2008 Summer Olympics and also participated in the 2012 Summer Olympics. She coached the Danish national dressage team from 2017 to 2021.

== Early life ==
Princess Nathalie was born on 2 May 1975 in Copenhagen, Denmark, the youngest of three children of Princess Benedikte of Denmark and Prince Richard of Sayn-Wittgenstein-Berleburg. She grew up at Schloss Berleburg in Bad Berleburg, Germany.

Nathalie and her sister Alexandra became Danish citizens on 19 May 1998. Neither she nor her siblings are in line of succession to the Danish throne, as that would have required taking up permanent residence in Denmark when reaching the age of mandatory education.

== Equestrian career ==
In 1994, Princess Nathalie began training at the Swedish stud Flyinge with Kyra Kyrklund, a former world champion in dressage. After four years, during which she won the bronze medal at the European Championship with the Danish team, she changed coaches when Kyrklund moved to England. She teamed up with Klaus Balkenhol, the coach of the German dressage team.

Nathalie was selected as a reserve rider for the 2000 Olympic team. In 2001, she received a bronze medal at that year's European Championships, and placed fourth individually at the 2002 World Championships. She was a member of the Danish dressage team at the 2008 Summer Olympics and was awarded a bronze medal.

She was part of the Danish equestrian team in the London 2012 Olympics, competing in team and individual dressage events on her horse Digby. She finished 12th in the individual event and helped Denmark to a 4th-place team finish.

In January 2017, Nathalie was named head coach of the Danish national dressage team. She left the position in 2021, but has since continued to coach national team riders Cathrine Laudrup-Dufour and Daniel Bachmann Andersen privately.

In addition to riding, she also breeds horses like her mother. In autumn 2005, she opened her own stud farm, which is based in Bad Berleburg.

== Marriage and children ==
On 4 January 2010, Princess Nathalie's engagement to German horse breeder Alexander Johannsmann (born 6 December 1977), son of showjumper Heinrich-Wilhelm Johannsmann, was announced. The couple married civilly 27 May 2010 and religiously the following year, on 18 June 2011 at the Protestant Stadtkirche in Berleburg, Germany.

Princess Nathalie gave birth to a son, Konstantin Gustav Heinrich Richard, on 24 July 2010. He was named Konstantin for his maternal grandfather, whose middle name is Konstantin, as well as for his maternal grand-uncle, King Constantine II of Greece; Gustav for his maternal uncle and godfather; Heinrich for his paternal grandfather; and Richard for his maternal grandfather. Konstantin's godparents were Crown Princess Mary of Denmark, his aunt Ann-Kathrin Johannsmann, and his uncle Prince Gustav. On 28 January 2015, she gave birth to her second child, a daughter named Louisa Margareta Benedikte Hanna, in Bad Berleburg, Germany.

On 15 August 2022, the Danish court confirmed that Nathalie and Johannsmann had divorced.

== Honours and awards ==
Styles of Princess Nathalie of Sayn-Wittgenstein-Berleburg
- Reference style: Her Highness
- Spoken style: Your Highness

=== Honours ===
- Sweden: Recipient of the 50th Birthday Badge Medal of King Carl XVI Gustaf

=== Awards ===
Medal record

Equestrian

Representing Denmark

Olympic Games
Bronze medal – third place	2008 Beijing	Team dressage

European Championships
Bronze medal – third place	2001 Verden	Team dressage

World Cup
Silver medal – second place	2011 Leipzig	Individual dressage

- International Olympic Committee: Bronze Medal for Team dressage of the 2008 Beijing Olympics
- International Olympic Committee: Bronze Medal of the Dressage World Cup
