= Carina Axelsson =

American author

Carina
- Princess of Sayn-Wittgenstein-Berleburg
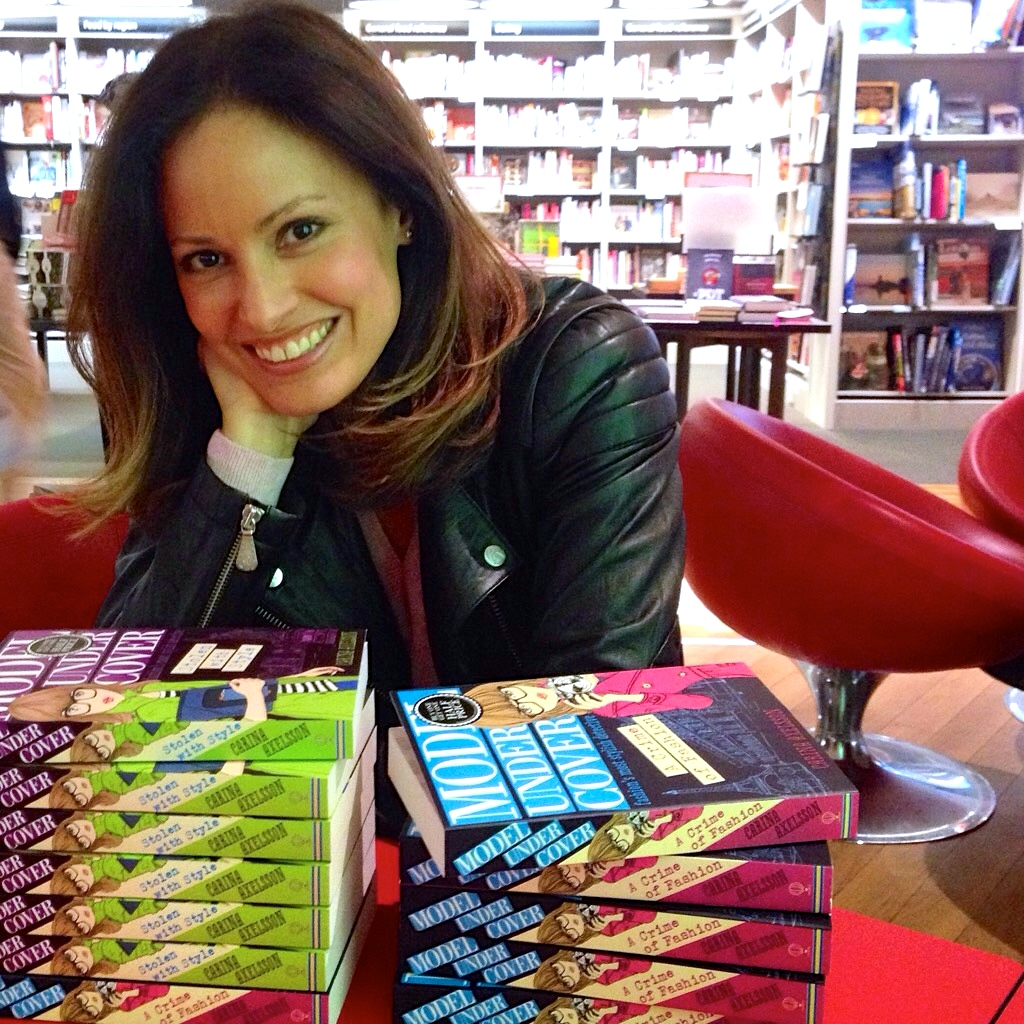
- Axelsson in 2014
- Born: Carina Axelsson; August 5, 1968 (age 57); Northern California, U.S.
- Spouse: Gustav, 7th Prince of Sayn-Wittgenstein-Berleburg (m. 2022)
- Issue: Prince Gustav Albrecht; Princess Mafalda
- Father: Bertil Axelsson
- Mother: Alicia Axelsson
- Occupation: Author; model (formerly)
- Writing career
- Genre: Mystery, young adult, children's
- Notable works: Model Undercover series

Carina, Princess of Sayn-Wittgenstein-Berleburg (born Carina Axelsson; August 5, 1968) is an American author and former model, best known for the teen fashion detective series Model Undercover. Her other series are the Nigel of Hyde Park books and the Royal Rebel books. As a model, she appeared on the covers of Madame Figaro, Elle, and Vogue Patterns in the 1990s. She is the wife of Gustav, 7th Prince of Sayn-Wittgenstein-Berleburg, making her part of the extended Danish royal family.

== Personal life ==
Carina Axelsson was born on August 5, 1968, in Northern California, United States, to Bertil and Alicia Axelsson. She has a brother Erik and sister Liselotte. Her father was an electronic engineer and was born in Sweden, and her mother is Mexican. After growing up in California, Axelsson moved to New York to pursue a career in fashion modelling.

On June 3, 2022, she married civilly the German-Danish aristocrat Gustav, 7th Prince of Sayn-Wittgenstein-Berleburg, thus becoming the Princess of Sayn-Wittgenstein-Berleburg, after dating for 19 years. They married religiously the following day in Bad Berleburg. They live at Schloss Berleburg in Germany with their four dogs. They were unable to marry earlier due to a clause in Gustav's grandfather's will (that was drawn up during the days of the Nazi Germany) preventing him from inheriting family property if he partakes in an unequal marriage (meaning with a commoner), a marriage with a non-Protestant or one with someone who is not of the Aryan race (meaning not of pure Caucasian and preferably German descent). His wife is a commoner, Catholic and part Mexican by birth, thus rendering her incompatible with the terms of the – surprisingly still legally valid – will as stipulated by her husband's grandfather. Nonetheless, she was treated by the Sayn-Wittgenstein-Berleburg House as his official partner and accompanied him to family events.

Axelsson is godmother to Countess Athena of Monpezat, only daughter of her husband's first cousin Prince Joachim of Denmark.

The couple's son, Prince Gustav Albrecht, was born on 26 May 2023 in the United States via surrogacy. On 26 April 2024, the couple welcomed their second child, a girl, Princess Mafalda, also via surrogacy.

== Career ==
Axelsson modeled for a number of notable magazines. She appeared in the August and September 1991 editions of the American version of Vogue, shot by photographers Robert Diadul in August and Angel Morale in September. In the December 1992 edition of Vogue Italia, she had a 10-page spread styled as Bianca Jagger, shot by German photographer Ellen von Unwerth. She appeared in Vogue Italia in later editions as well, including February 1993, again shot by von Unwerth, and in 1995. She appeared on the July 1993 cover of French magazine Madame Figaro, the September 1993 cover of the German edition of Elle magazine, followed by the January/February 1994 edition of Vogue Patterns magazine.

From New York, Axelsson moved to Paris, where she studied art and wrote and illustrated her first book, a picture book for children (Nigel of Hyde Park, 2004, Assouline). Axelsson continued in fashion with a short stint working as PA to fashion designer John Galliano. Her experiences in fashion - along with a love of Scooby-Doo and Agatha Christie - inspired her to write the Model Undercover book series. Axelsson announced the series in a 2014 article for The Children's Book Review, and the book was released that year. Clare O'Beara of Fresh Fiction stated "her mystery series is a winner as far as I'm concerned."

== Published works ==
=== Nigel of Hyde Park series ===
- Nigel of Hyde Park. Assouline. 2004. ISBN 978-2843236143.
- Nigel von Hyde Park. Knesebeck. 2005. ISBN 978-1474942423.

=== Model Undercover series ===
- Model Undercover: A Crime of Fashion. Usborne Publishing. 2014. ISBN 9781409563686.
- Model Undercover: Stolen with Style. Usborne Publishing. September 2014. ISBN 978-1409563709.
- Model Undercover: Deadly by Design. Usborne Publishing. June 2015. ISBN 978-1409590262.
- Model Undercover: Dressed to Kill. Usborne Publishing. November 2016. ISBN 978-1474906913.

=== Royal Rebel series ===
- Royal Rebel. Usborne Publishing. August 2018. ISBN 978-1474942409.
- Royal Rebel: Designer. Usborne Publishing. August 2019. ISBN 978-1474942416.
- Royal Rebel: Stylist. Usborne Publishing. September 2019. ISBN 978-1474942416.

== Filmography ==
Film
Year	Title	Role	Director	Notes
1992	Inferno	Party guest	Ellen von Unwerth	Television film
