= Gustav, 7th Prince of Sayn-Wittgenstein-Berleburg =

German nobleman (born 1969)

Gustav
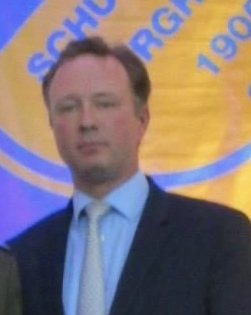
- Prince Gustav in 2015

Prince of Sayn-Wittgenstein-Berleburg
- Reign: 13 March 2017 – present
- Predecessor: Prince Richard
- Heir apparent: Prince Gustav Albrecht
- Born: 12 January 1969 (age 57); Frankfurt am Main, West Germany
- Spouse: Carina Axelsson (m. 2022)
- Issue: Prince Gustav Albrecht; Princess Mafalda
Names
- Gustav Frederik Philip Richard
- House: Sayn-Wittgenstein-Berleburg
- Father: Richard, 6th Prince of Sayn-Wittgenstein-Berleburg
- Mother: Princess Benedikte of Denmark

Gustav, 7th Prince of Sayn-Wittgenstein-Berleburg (Gustav Frederik Philip Richard; born 12 January 1969), is the eldest child and only son of Princess Benedikte of Denmark and Richard, 6th Prince of Sayn-Wittgenstein-Berleburg. His first cousin is King Frederik X of Denmark.

== Biography ==
Prince Gustav is the head of the House of Sayn-Wittgenstein-Berleburg, the senior branch of the formerly princely house of Sayn-Wittgenstein. He resides at Schloss Berleburg-Wittgenstein in the town of Bad Berleburg, in North Rhine-Westphalia, Germany. He is the son of Prince Richard of Sayn-Wittgenstein-Berleburg and Princess Benedikte of Denmark and has two sisters, Princess Alexandra of Sayn-Wittgenstein-Berleburg and Princess Nathalie of Sayn-Wittgenstein-Berleburg.

The principality and princely title of Sayn-Wittgenstein-Berleburg descended, historically, according to semi-Salic primogeniture. If Gustav were to die without legitimate issue, the family heritage would devolve upon his father's younger brother, Prince Robin zu Sayn-Wittgenstein-Berleburg.

Gustav was formerly engaged to be married to Elvire Pasté de Rochefort (granddaughter of French Ambassador André Rodocanachi and wife Nada Diplarakou, herself sister of Aliki Diplarakou and grand-aunt of Princess Sibilla of Luxembourg); the engagement was announced on 16 August 2000 and the wedding planned for 12 May 2001 in Paris. However the wedding did not take place, reportedly due to financial issues with the bride's family, and it was announced on 16 July 2001 that they had separated. For many years, he resided with his partner, Carina Axelsson, although they were unable to marry due to a clause in Gustav's grandfather's will preventing him from inheriting family property if he marries someone not of Protestant, noble and Aryan descent. However, on 27 April 2022, the Danish court confirmed that Gustav could marry Axelsson on 3 June 2022, civilly and on 4 June 2022, religiously in Bad Berleburg.

The couple's son, Prince Gustav Albrecht, was born on 26 May 2023 in the United States via surrogacy. On 26 April 2024, the couple welcomed their second child, a girl, Princess Mafalda, also via surrogacy.

He is the godfather of Count Richard von Pfeil und Klein-Ellguth, son of his sister Alexandra; Konstantin Johannsmann, son of his second sister Nathalie; and Prince Vincent of Denmark, son of his first cousin, Frederik X.

German nobility
Preceded by Richard	— TITULAR — Prince of Sayn-Wittgenstein-Berleburg; 2017–present Reason for succession failure: German Revolution of 1918–1919	Incumbent; Heir: Gustav Albrecht
