= Michael Ahlefeldt-Laurvig-Bille =

Danish count and landowner (born 1965)

Count Michael Ahlefeldt-Laurvig-Bille
- Born: 26 February 1965 (age 61); Svendborg, Denmark
- Noble family: Ahlefeldt
- Spouses: Margrethe Kirketerp-Møller (m. 1992; death 1995) Caroline Søeborg-Ohlsen (m. 2006; div. 2016) Princess Alexandra of Sayn-Wittgenstein-Berleburg (m. 2019)
- Father: Claus Christian Ahlefeldt-Laurvig-Bille
- Mother: Merete-Anette von Lüttichau

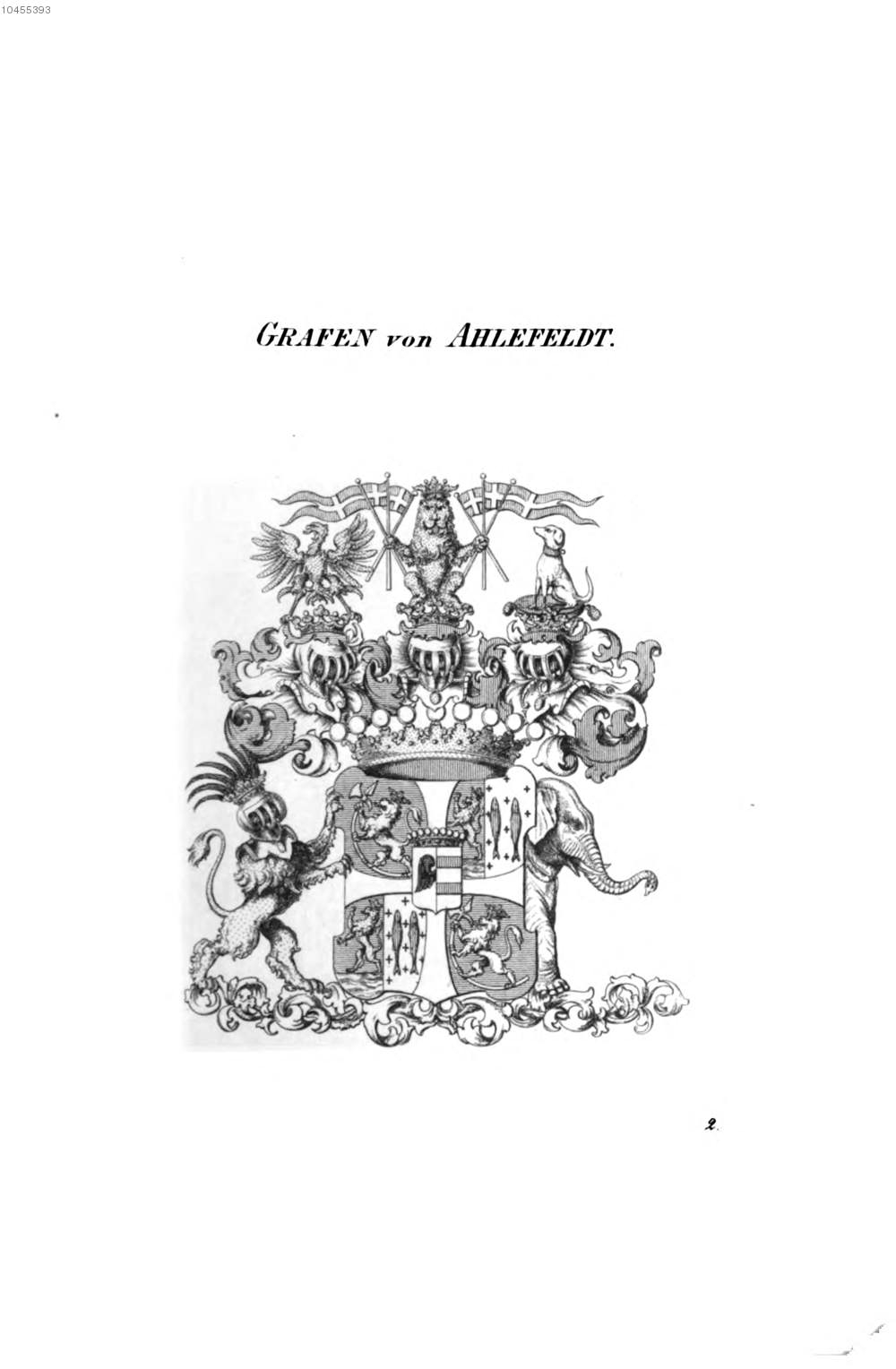
Coat of Arms of the Ahlefeldt family

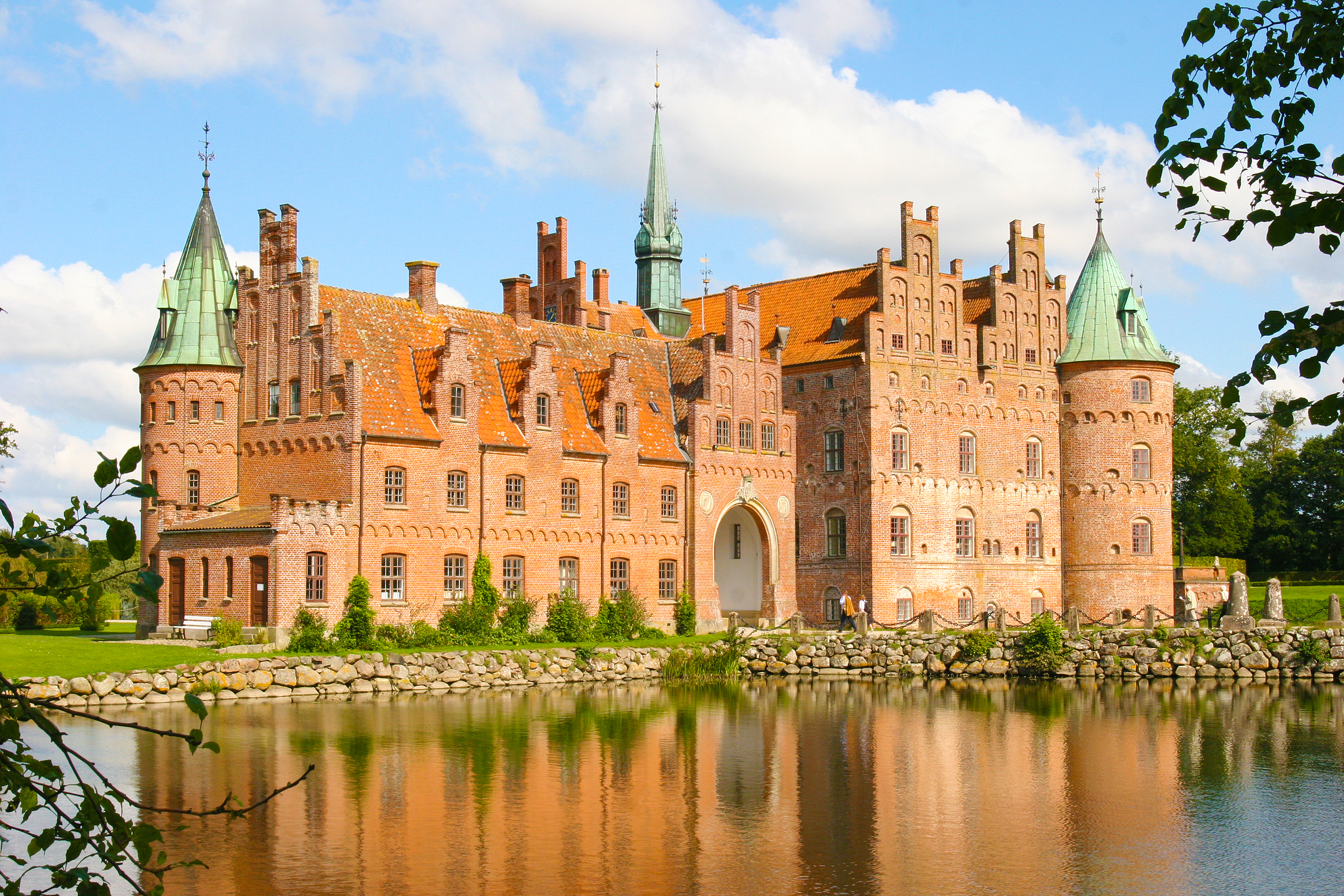
Egeskov castle: Count Michael's residence and ancestral seat of the Counts of Ahlefeldt

Michael Preben, Count Ahlefeldt-Laurvig-Bille (Danish: Michael Preben Greve Ahlefeldt-Laurvig-Bille; born 26 February 1965) is a Danish count and a landowner.

== Early life ==
By birth, he is a member of the ancient German House of Ahlefeldt. He was born as the only son of Count Claus Christian Ahlefeldt-Laurvig-Bille (Copenhagen, 6 March 1932 – 2014), landlord of Havnø Gods, Hadsund, and his second wife, Countess Merete-Anette von Lüttichau, née Ahlefeldt-Laurvig (born in Rudkøbing, 1 April 1943), a trained nurse. The couple married at Tranekær Kirke, Tranekær, on 21 September 1963 and divorced in 1971. His mother, Countess Merete-Anette was also her husband's third cousin.

He has one sister, Countess Suzanne Ingrid Jessie Dorthe Ahlefeldt-Laurvig-Bille (b. Svendborg, 4 March 1967), lady-in-waiting to former Princess Alexandra, who married in Mahé, Seychelles, on 15 February 1993 Erik Ove Carl John Emil Vind til Sanderumgaard (b. Hellerup, 5 May 1954), the grandson of Prince Erik of Denmark.

His father married firstly in Taarnborg Gods, Korsør, on 2 August 1958 and divorced Countess Marianne Moltke (b. Kruusesminde Gods, Korsør, 18 October 1936), Landlady in Kruusesminde Gods, Korsør, married thirdly on 9 September 1976 and divorced in 1995 Baroness Louisa of Wedell-Wedellsborg (b. San Francisco, California, 8 June 1939) and married fourthly in 2002 Bente Skipper.

== Biography ==
In 1992, he assumed ownership of the family's residence Egeskov Castle near Kværndrup, from his father Count Claus Christian. Under his ownership, Egeskov Castle has been turned into one of Funen's major tourist attractions. He was awarded the title of Hofjægermester (hunting master of the court) in 2006 and the title of Kammerherre (chamberlain) in 2015.

== Personal life ==
Michael married firstly in 1992 to Margrethe Kirketerp-Møller (27 March 1965 - aft. 1995), the daughter of Mogens Kirketerp-Møller (12 October 1936 - 25 February 2018), landlord and owner of Sandholt castle, and his wife Lisbeth Clausen (m. 22 February 1963). They have a son and a daughter:

- Countess Marie-Sophie Elisabeth Ahlefeldt-Laurvig-Bille (born 2 April 1993)
- Count Gregers Carl Preben Ahlefeldt-Laurvig-Bille (born 31 May 1995), a godson of the King of Denmark

He married secondly Caroline Søeborg-Ohlsen (b. 1968) on 26 August 2006. She is the daughter of cellist Bertel Søeborg Ohlsen and his wife, Anette Faaborg (b. 1942), a pianist. The couple divorced in 2016 and have two children:

- Count Julius Søeborg Ahlefeldt-Laurvig-Bille (born 2007), a godson of Prince Joachim of Denmark
- Countess Iselin Kristine Søeborg Ahlefeldt-Laurvig-Bille (born 2009)

On 18 May 2019, he married Princess Alexandra of Sayn-Wittgenstein-Berleburg, niece of Queen Margrethe II of Denmark, at Sankt Jørgens Kirke in Svendborg. They currently live at Egeskov Castle, ancestral home and a country residence of the Counts of Ahlefeldt, which is managed by Count Michael Preben, while Princess Alexandra engages herself in drawing, garden designing and art history.
