= Death and funeral of Constantine II of Greece =

Death and funeral of the last King of Greece

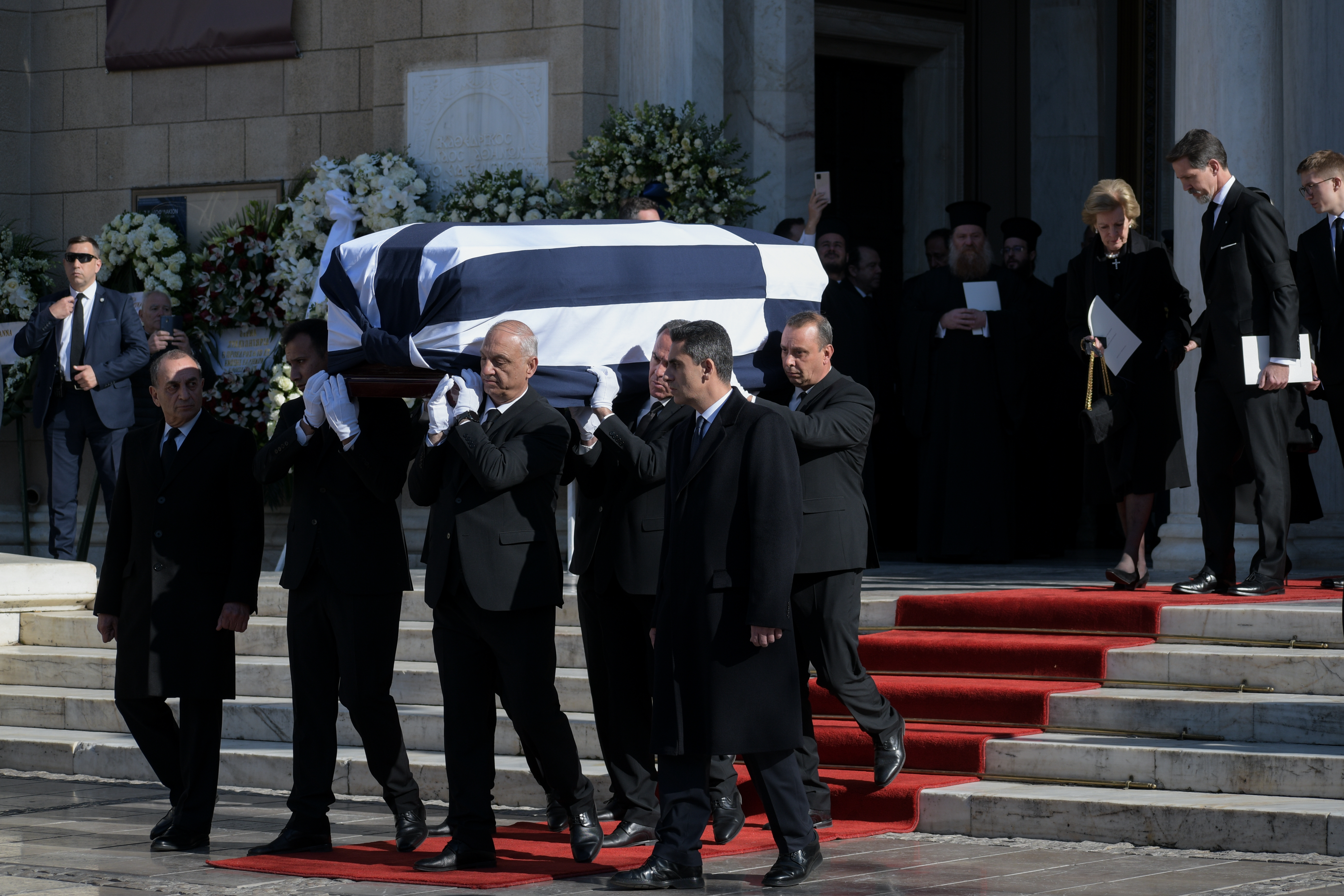
- Pallbearers carrying Constantine's coffin, with Queen Anne-Marie and Crown Prince Pavlos behind them
- Date: 10 January 2023; 3 years ago (death); 16 January 2023; 3 years ago (funeral and burial); 27 February 2024; 2 years ago (thanksgiving service)
- Time: 6:00–11:00 am (Note: All dates within this article are in UTC+2 time.) (lying-in-state); 12:30–2:00 pm (funeral); 4:00–5:00 pm (burial); 11:00 am–12:00 pm (thanksgiving service)
- Duration: ~11 hours (Note: From the beginning of the lying-in-state to the end of the burial.)
- Venue: Saint Eleftherios Chapel (lying-in-state); Metropolitan Cathedral of Athens (funeral); Church of the Resurrection (burial ceremony); St George's Chapel (thanksgiving service)
- Location: Athens (funeral); Tatoi Palace (burial); Windsor, Berkshire (thanksgiving service)
- Type: Private burial
- Participants: See list of funeral dignitaries

Constantine II of Greece, the head of the Royal House of Greece and last king of the Hellenes, died on 10 January 2023 in Athens at the age of 82, having already been placed under intensive care after suffering a stroke in hospital. The Greek government declined the royal family's request for a state funeral, although it was later decided to accord Constantine a lying-in-state and a funeral procession.

On 16 January, Constantine's body was laid for public viewing in the Saint Eleftherios Chapel in Athens from 6:00 am to 11:00 am (UTC+2), followed by a funeral at noon in the Metropolitan Cathedral of Athens. He was then buried privately at Tatoi Palace by his family. Members of royal houses from seventeen countries were in attendance, including members of the Spanish royal family and Danish royal family, and several European monarchs.

== Background ==
In the last few years of his life, Constantine had been experiencing "chronic heart" problems. In September 2022, due to ill health, he was unable to travel to the United Kingdom to attend the state funeral of Queen Elizabeth II, his third cousin, and the widow of his first cousin once removed, Prince Philip, Duke of Edinburgh. His last public appearance occurred in Athens in October 2022 when he went to a restaurant for lunch with his wife, Queen Anne-Marie, and his two sisters, Queen Sofía of Spain and Princess Irene. Although he remained undisturbed during his meal, Spanish tourists later noticed Queen Sofía and a Greek civilian recognised the former king, who was being pushed in a wheelchair with nasal catheters that provided him with supplementary oxygen, prompting concerns for his health. His heart and mobility issues had "worsened" in the twelve months prior to his death and resulted in multiple hospitalisations in 2022. He also suffered through a severe case of COVID-19.

== Death ==
On 9 January 2023, it was revealed that Constantine had been hospitalised and was in a "serious, but stable" condition. His family was said to be at his side, and his two sons, Crown Prince Pavlos and Prince Nikolaos, were meeting in the Maximos Mansion to discuss the events that would occur following his death. Constantine's daughter-in-law, Princess Tatiana, was seen lighting a candle at church in prayer for his health. He had been placed in the intensive care unit of the private Hygeia Hospital following a stroke, but died on 10 January 2023. He was 82 years old. Constantine died one day short of the centenary anniversary of the death of his grandfather, Constantine I.

His death was leaked publicly by an Associated Press report, which referenced hospital staff. Constantine's private office later formally announced, "It is with deep sadness that the royal family announces that HM King Constantine, beloved husband, father, and brother, passed away yesterday." Despite the abolition of the monarchy in 1973, Constantine never formally renounced his title as King of the Hellenes due to Greek Orthodox tradition, which holds that an anointed monarch retains their status until their death. However, he had accepted that he would be styled as the former King of the Hellenes by the media. Upon his death, the International Olympic Committee and Hellenic Olympic Committee flew the flags at the Panathenaic Stadium and the flags at the Hellenic Olympic Committee offices at half-mast. The flags at Amalienborg Palace were also lowered to half-mast.

Constantine II was survived by his wife, Anne-Marie, his sisters, Sofía and Irene, and his five children, Crown Prince Pavlos, Prince Nikolaos, Princess Alexia, Princess Theodora and Prince Philippos, as well as his nine grandchildren. He also had nine godchildren, including Prince Constantijn of the Netherlands, Margareta, Custodian of the Crown of Romania, William, Prince of Wales, and Lady Gabriella Kingston.

== Funeral ==
=== Planning ===
Following Constantine's death, it was announced a discussion would be held later that day at the Maximos Mansion to decide whether a state funeral is appropriate. Following the discussion, it was decided that Constantine would not receive a state funeral, but would rather be buried as a private citizen. It was also announced that his burial location would be at Tatoi Palace, where other past Greek royal family members have been buried. The funeral location was decided to be the Metropolitan Cathedral of Athens on Monday 16 January. Lina Mendoni, the Minister of Culture and Sports, was also called to be the government's representative at the funeral. The government also declined requests for a lying-in-state for Constantine's body. Many right-wing politicians reportedly were upset with the decision for neither a state funeral nor a lying-in-state, something which was requested by his family.

The prime minister of Greece, Kyriakos Mitsotakis, defended the government's decision by insisting that Constantine was only the leader of the "Kingdom of Greece, which no longer exists". Despite this, a funeral procession was still planned to occur outside the Metropolitan Cathedral of Athens. On 12 January 2023, Queen Sofía of Spain, Princess Irene and Princess Nina, as well as Princess Theodora's fiancé, Matthew Kumar, were photographed visiting the royal cemetery at Tatoi Palace for preparations at the royal tombs ahead of Constantine's funeral. Mitsotakis received backlash from many, including former Greek Prime Minister Antonis Samaras, over his decision to deny Constantine a state funeral, and he later agreed to put the former king's body on display in an unofficial lying-in-state, while also giving him the "honours of a state leader". Police also stated that they would "have a presence at vital points around the Metropolitan Cathedral and Tatoi, as well as the funeral procession's route and the locations where invited officials stay."

=== Lying-in-state and ceremony ===
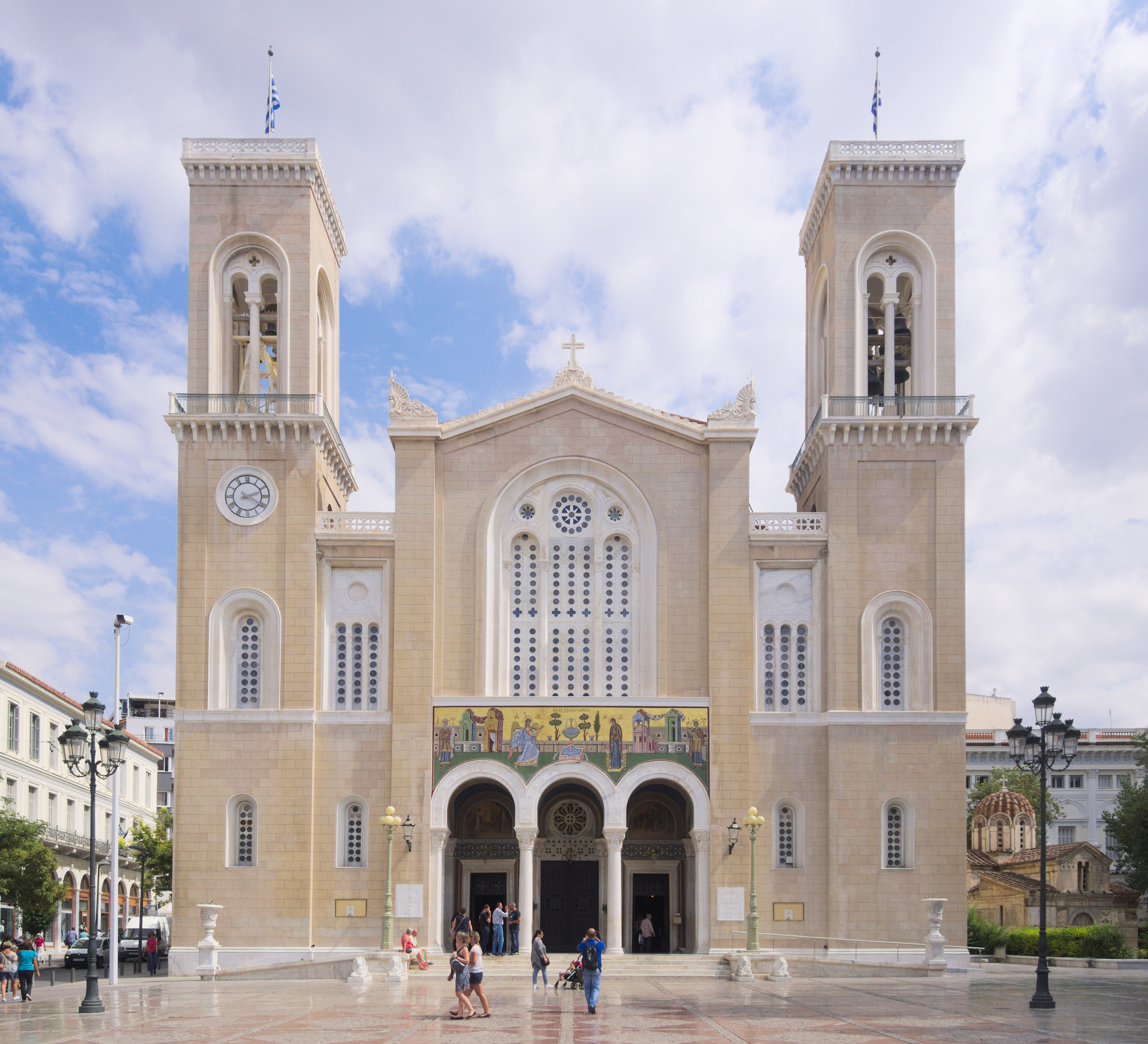
The funeral took place in the Metropolitan Cathedral of Athens

Royal guests began arriving in Greece on 15 January 2023 and most of them stayed at the Hotel Grande Bretagne, where both reporting mediai and crowds greeted them. Constantine's body laid in the Agios Eleftherios Chapel from 6:00 am till 11:00 am (UTC+2), allowing members of the public to pay their respects. Thousands of mourners viewed his coffin. By 8:00 pm (UTC+2), police estimates placed over 5,000 mourners to have visited Constantine's coffin. Afterwards, a procession into the Metropolitan Cathedral of Athens occurred. Τhe procession was headed by a crucifer, followed by two priests, including Archbishop Ieronymos II, then the coffin, which was draped in the current flag of Greece, and finally Constantine's three sons, with crowds watching from the side. Members of the public were chanting "Immortal" and "Constantine, you will never die" and held flowers, flags of the Kingdom of Greece and pictures of Constantine and Anne-Marie. Some people were chanting, "Long live the king!"

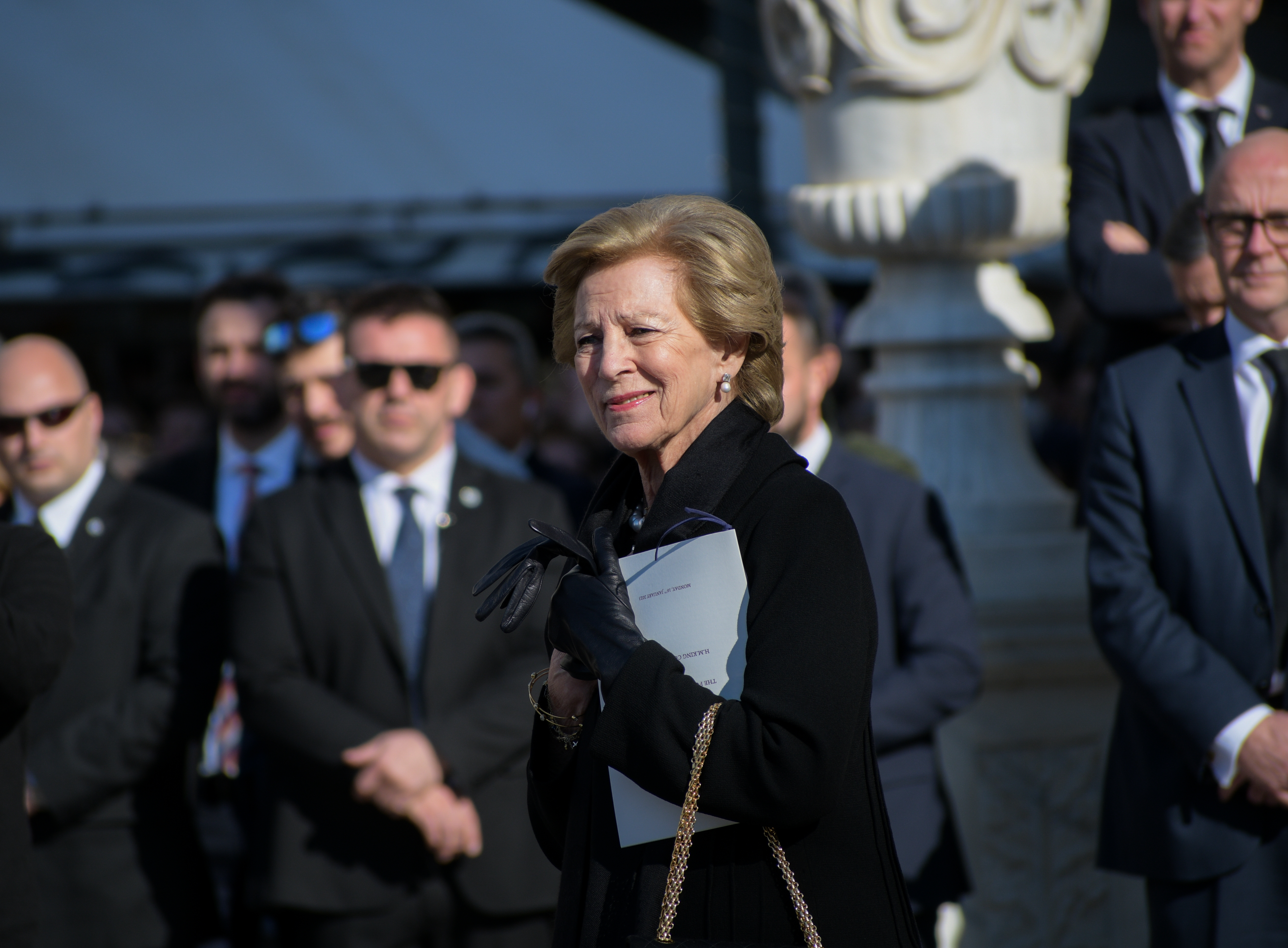
Anne-Marie of Greece at her late husband's funeral

Constantine's body was moved through the church's nave then placed in the centre of the chancel with wreaths, icons and medals surrounding it. Government officials were jeered and booed by the crowd upon their arrival at the ceremony. The wreaths beside Constantine's coffin were made out of lily of the valleys, which were the same flowers that Anne-Marie's wedding bouquet was made out of. On the wreath was written in white letters on blue felt, "Your beloved Anne-Marie" (Greek: Η αγαπημένη σου Άννα-Μαρία, romanized: I agapiméni sou Ánna-María), which were revealed, through an attached card, to have been Anne-Marie's last words to Constantine. His three sons decided on the various medals displayed on his coffin, which were the Commemorative Badge of the Centenary of the Royal House of Greece, the Medal of Military Merit, the Order of the Dannebrog, the Order of the Elephant, the Order of George I, the Order of the Golden Fleece, the Order of the Phoenix, the Order of the Redeemer, the Order of Saints George and Constantine and his 1960 Summer Olympic Games golden medal.

The funeral ceremony commenced at 12:30 pm (UTC+2) and over two hundred people were in attendance, including nine monarchs. The Greek government was officially represented by deputy prime minister of Greece, Panayiotis Pikrammenos, as well as by the Minister of Culture, who attended the ceremony. Prime Minister Mitsotakis declared that his party's members of Greek parliament were at liberty to attend on their own accord. Anne-Marie wore the same diamond cross from her wedding at the funeral ceremony. Archbishop Ieronymos II presided over the ceremony, standing at the front of the church with twenty other priests. To the right and left of him stood two Byzantine choirs and further right sat Constantine's descendants, wife and two sisters. Foreign monarchs, heads of states and other royal family members were seated further left of the Greek royal family. Behind the family were four Orthodox Bishops. Crown Prince Pavlos delivered Constantine's eulogy at the end of the service. The recessional consisted of the same order as the procession, except with the whole Greek royal family followed by all guests at the end. Crowds sang the Greek national anthem as Constantine's coffin exited the cathedral. Over 1,000 police officers were in Athens on the day to secure the funeral. The funeral was streamed on television and online by the Hellenic Broadcasting Corporation (ERT).

=== Burial ===
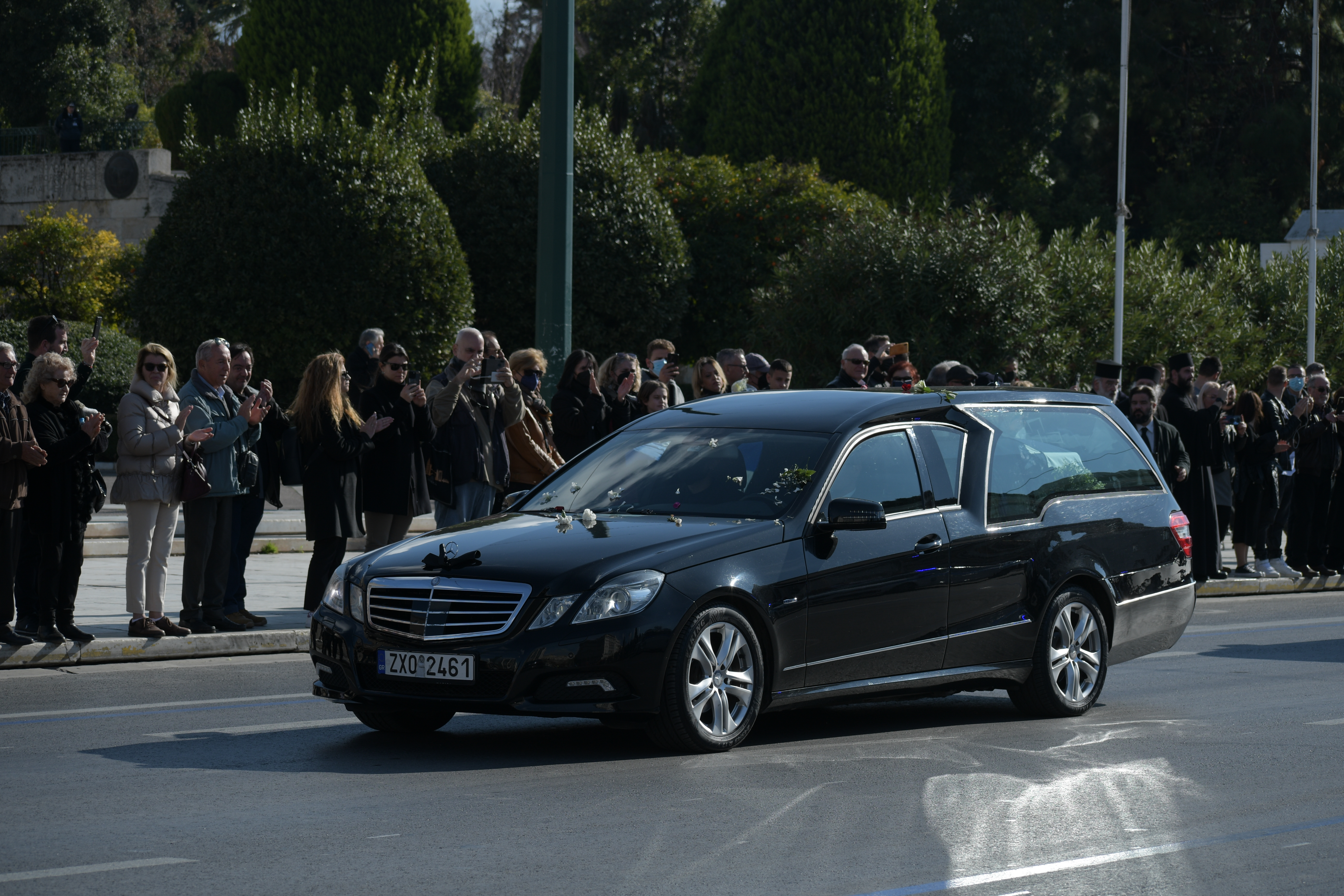
The hearse taking Constantine's coffin to Tatoi Palace

The burial was a private event at Tatoi Palace, the residence of the former Greek royal family. Much of the land surrounding Tatoi Palace was destroyed in the 2021 Greece wildfires and no clean-up effort was undertaken. Following the announcement that Constantine's memorial would take place there, clean-up crews arrived to have the site cleared in days. New trees were said to have been planted, burnt trees were removed, newly-pathed gravel pathways were installed and a nearby church was repaired by "frantic" workers.

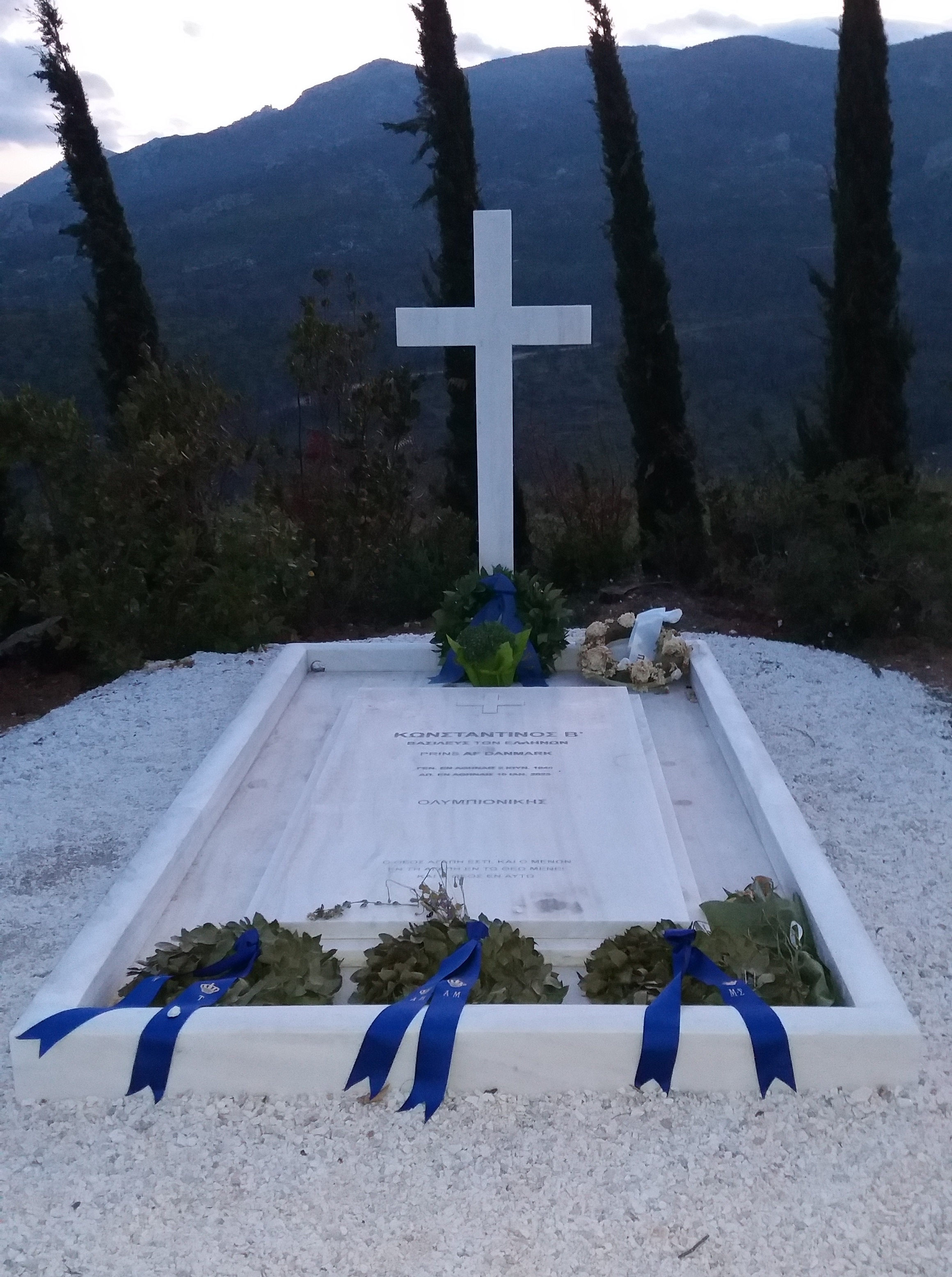
Tomb of Constantine II in the Tatoi Royal Cemetery

After the funeral, with police escort and five supervising drones and two helicopters, Constantine's body was driven 29 kilometres to Tatoi Palace via Metropolitan Road, which was closed to the public from 6:00 am to 2:00 pm (UTC+2). It took at least 40 vehicles to transport all 60 guests who attended the burial to Tatoi Palace. The coffin was greeted by many people who were waiting at Tatoi Palace. Although the burial committal ceremony at Agios Athanasios, the chapel at Tatoi Palace, was photographed, there were no press or photographers during the actual burial, as requested by his family. At the burial committal ceremony, Constantine's coffin was covered in a wreath, his Olympic medal and the monarchical flag of Greece. The burial was said to have happened around 4:00 pm (UTC+2). The burial's dignitaries attended a memorial dinner in the evening.

Just under two weeks later, a severe storm caused minor damage to the outer edge of Constantine's coffin. Per Greek customary traditions, the coffin had yet to be sealed up as 40 days had yet to pass after his death. On 18 February 2023, a service at the Metropolitan Cathedral to mark 40 days since Constantine's death was held at 11:00 am (UTC+2). It was officiated by Archbishop Ieronymos and was attended by Anne-Marie, her and Constantine's children, their grandchildren, Constantine's sisters, other members of the Greek royal family and over 250 members of the public. At the front of the cathedral was a kolivo with letters spelling his name in Greek (Greek: ΚΩΝΣΤΑΝΤΊΝΟΣ Β', romanized: KONSTANTÍNOS II) on top. Afterwards, a lunch was held for the Greek royal family and close friends. A service to unveil Constantine's tomb with a Trisagion hymn occurred the following morning.

== Funeral dignitaries ==
=== Immediate family ===
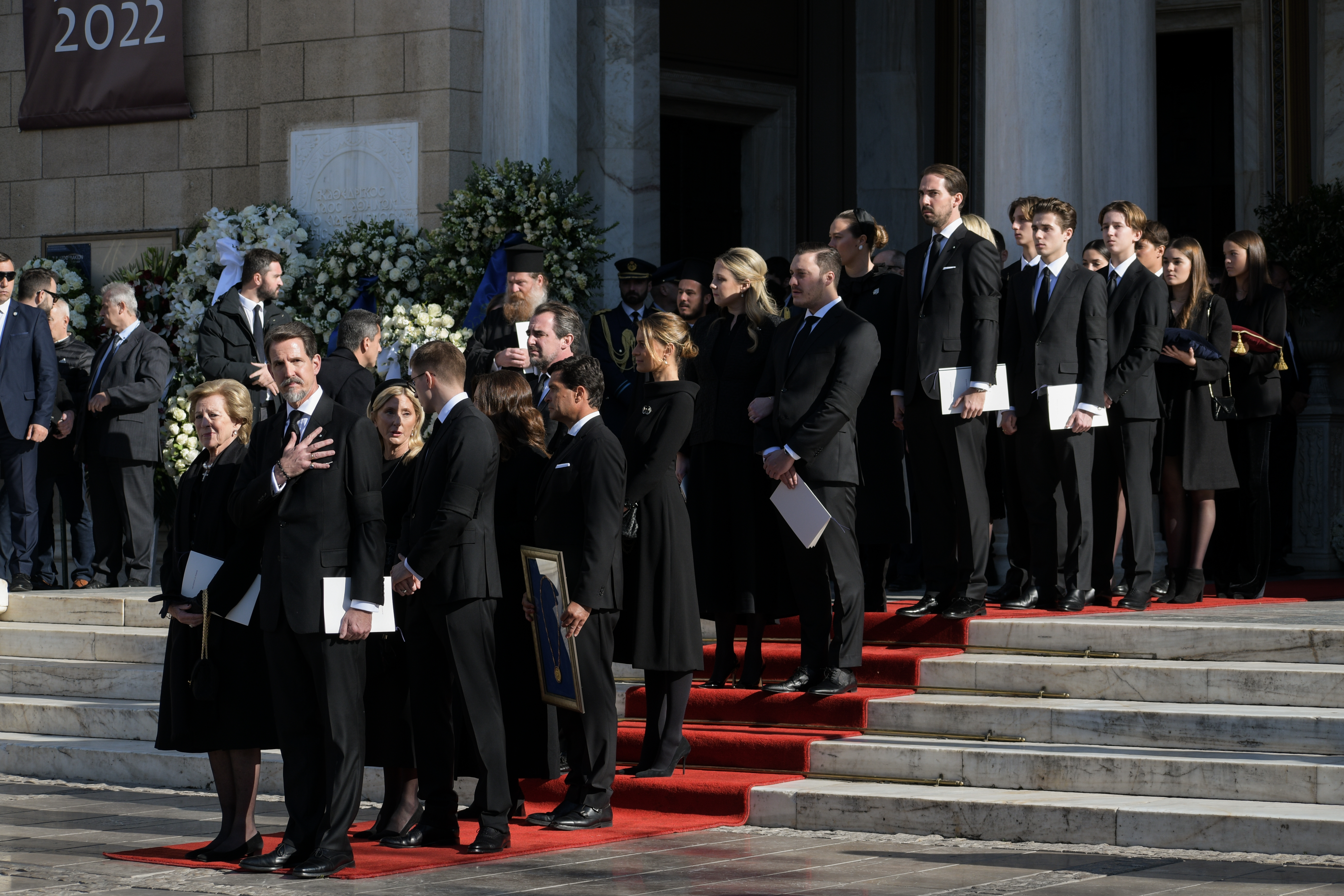
The Greek royal family following Constantine's funeral, looking at the crowd

- Queen Anne-Marie, the late King's widow
  - Princess Alexia and Carlos Morales Quintana, the late King's daughter and son-in-law
    - Arrietta Morales y de Grecia, the late King's granddaughter
    - Anna-Maria Morales y de Grecia, the late King's granddaughter
    - Carlos Morales y de Grecia, the late King's grandson
    - Amelia Morales y de Grecia, the late King's granddaughter
  - Crown Prince Pavlos and Crown Princess Marie-Chantal, the late King's son and daughter-in-law
    - Princess Maria-Olympia, the late King's granddaughter
    - Prince Constantine-Alexios, the late King's grandson
    - Prince Achileas-Andreas, the late King's grandson
    - Prince Odysseas-Kimon, the late King's grandson
    - Prince Aristidis-Stavros, the late King's grandson
  - Prince Nikolaos and Princess Tatiana, the late King's son and daughter-in-law
  - Princess Theodora and Matthew Kumar, the late King's daughter and her fiancé
  - Prince Philippos and Princess Nina, the late King's son and daughter-in-law
- Queen Sofía and King Juan Carlos I of Spain, the late King's sister and brother-in-law
  - (Spain) The Duchess of Lugo, the late King's niece
    - (Spain) Felipe de Marichalar y Borbón, the late King's grandnephew
    - (Spain) Victoria de Marichalar y Borbón, the late King's grandniece
  - Infanta Cristina of Spain, the late King's niece
    - (Spain) Juan Urdangarin y Borbón, the late King's grandnephew
    - (Spain) Pablo Urdangarin y Borbón, the late King's grandnephew
    - (Spain) Miguel Urdangarin y Borbón, the late King's grandnephew
    - (Spain) Irene Urdangarin y Borbón, the late King's grandniece
  - The King and Queen of Spain, the late King's nephew and his wife
- Princess Irene, the late King's sister
- Prince Michael and Marina Karella, the late King's first cousin once removed and his wife
  - Princess Alexandra, Mrs. Mirzayantz, the late King's second cousin
    - Darius Mirzayantz, the late King's second cousin once removed
- The Queen of Denmark, the late King's sister-in-law
  - The Crown Prince of Denmark, the late King's nephew by marriage
  - Prince Joachim of Denmark, the late King's nephew by marriage
- (Denmark) The Dowager Princess of Sayn-Wittgenstein-Berleburg, the late King's sister-in-law
  - (Denmark) Princess Alexandra of Sayn-Wittgenstein-Berleburg, the late King's niece by marriage

=== Greece ===
- Panayiotis Pikrammenos, Deputy Prime Minister of Greece
- Lina Mendoni, Minister of Culture and Sports
- Antonis Samaras and Georgia Kretikos, former Prime Minister of Greece and his wife
- Makis Voridis and Danai Michelakos, Minister of the Interior and his wife
- Dimitrios Vartzopoulos, Member of Parliament for Thessaloniki B (New Democracy)
- Miltiadis Chrysomallis, Member of Parliament for Messinia (New Democracy)
- Periklis Mantas, Member of Parliament for Messinia (New Democracy)
- Athanasios Davakis, Member of Parliament for Lakonia (New Democracy)
- Giorgos Koumoutsakos, Member of Parliament for Athens B (New Democracy)
- Katerina Monogyiou, Member of Parliament for Cyclades (New Democracy)
- Konstantinos Bogdanos, Member of Parliament for Athens A (Patriotic Force for Change)
- Anna-Michelle Assimakopoulou, Member of the European Parliament (New Democracy/European People's Party)
- Alkiviadis Stefanis, former Deputy Minister for National Defence and former Chief of the Hellenic Army General Staff
- Nikolaos Nikolopoulos, former Deputy Minister of Labour, Social Security and Welfare and former Member of Parliament for Achaea (New Democracy/Independent Greeks)
- Giorgos Kalatzis, former Member of Parliament for Kavala (New Democracy)
- Dimitris Kammenos, former Member of Parliament for Piraeus B (Independent Greeks/Force of Hellenism)
- Spyros Capralos, president of the Hellenic Olympic Committee
- Marianna Vardinogiannis, UNESCO Goodwill Ambassador
- Metropolitan Theodoritos of Laodicea (representing the Ecumenical Patriarch of Constantinople)
- Archimandrite Raphael, Exarch of the Holy Sepulchre in Greece (representing the Patriarch of Jerusalem)
- Metropolitan George of Guinea (representing the Patriarch of Alexandria)

=== Foreign ===
==== Members of reigning royal houses ====
- (Belgium) The King and Queen of the Belgians, the late King's third cousin once removed (Queen Anne-Marie's second cousin once removed) and his wife
- Queen Noor of Jordan
  - Princess Raiyah bint Al Hussein of Jordan
- Princess Sarvath El Hassan of Jordan
- Princess Margaretha of Liechtenstein, the late King's third cousin once removed (Queen Anne-Marie's second cousin once removed) (representing the Prince of Liechtenstein)
  - Princess Maria-Anunciata of Liechtenstein and Carlo Emanuele Musini, the late King's third cousin twice removed (Queen Anne-Marie's second cousin twice removed) and her husband
- The Grand Duke of Luxembourg, the late King's third cousin once removed (Queen Anne-Marie's second cousin once removed)
- The Prince of Monaco, brother-in-law of the late King's first cousin
- Princess Beatrix of the Netherlands, the late King's fourth cousin (Queen Anne-Marie's half-second cousin once removed)
  - The King and Queen of the Netherlands, the late King's fourth cousin once removed (Queen Anne-Marie's half-third cousin) and his wife
- The Crown Prince and Crown Princess of Norway, the late King's third cousin once removed (Queen Anne-Marie's second cousin once removed) and his wife (representing the King of Norway)
- Princess Märtha Louise of Norway, the late King's third cousin once removed (Queen Anne-Marie's second cousin once removed)
- The King and Queen of Sweden, the late King's third cousin (Queen Anne-Marie's first cousin) and his wife
- (Sweden) Princess Christina, Mrs. Magnuson, the late King's third cousin (Queen Anne-Marie's first cousin)
- (United Kingdom) The Princess Royal and Vice Admiral Sir Timothy Laurence, the late King's second cousin and her husband
- (United Kingdom) Lady Gabriella Kingston, the late King's second cousin once removed and goddaughter

==== Members of non-reigning royal houses ====
- The Margrave and Margravine of Baden, the late King's second cousin once removed and his wife
- Tsar Simeon II of Bulgaria, the late King's fourth cousin once removed
- Chantal Hochuli, ex-wife of the late King's first cousin
  - The Hereditary Prince and Hereditary Princess of Hanover, the late King's first cousin once removed and his wife
  - Prince and Princess Christian of Hanover, the late King's first cousin once removed and his wife
- Empress Farah of Iran
- Prince Radu of Romania, husband of the late King's goddaughter and first cousin once removed (representing the Custodian of the Crown of Romania)
- Grand Duchess Maria Vladimirovna of Russia, the late King's third cousin
- Prince Alexander of Schleswig-Holstein, the late King's third cousin
- Crown Prince Alexander and Crown Princess Katherine of Yugoslavia, the late King's first cousin once removed and his wife

==== Other notable guests ====
- Marie Blanche Bierlein, mother of the late King's daughter-in-law, Princess Tatiana
- Michalis Chandris, shipowner
- Pia Getty, sister of the late King's daughter-in-law, Crown Princess Marie-Chantal
- Thomas Flohr, father of the late King's daughter-in-law, Princess Nina
- Katharina Flohr, mother of the late King's daughter-in-law, Princess Nina
  - Sophia Flohr, half-sister of the late King's daughter-in-law, Princess Nina
- Alexandros Lykourezos, lawyer of the late King
- Eugenia Manolidou
- Nasos Thanopoulos and Nasia Thanopoulos
- Nikolas Tsakos and Celia Kritharioti

== Reactions ==
=== Family ===
- Crown Prince Pavlos, Constantine's eldest son and heir, delivered his father's eulogy, highlighting certain parts of his life and said, "You will always live on in our thoughts and our hearts, as happens in every Greek family when it loses something precious."
- Prince Achileas-Andreas, Pavlos' son and Constantine's grandson, released an Instagram post memorising his father forty days after his death, stating: "Mr dearest Apapa, we all miss you so much. Sailing on into your new adventure. Love, Achileas".
- Princess Maria-Olympia said that her "beloved Apapa" would always be "forever in [her] heart".
- Crown Princess Marie-Chantal, Pavlos' wife and Constantine's daughter-in-law, also mourned on Instagram, "Yesterday marked the 40 days since you left us. You will always be in our hearts and never forgotten."
- Princess Tatiana, Prince Nikolaos' wife and Constantine's daughter-in-law, said on Instagram, "It's almost impossible to post a picture when you want to say so much and there are not enough words to describe what a wonderful man you were and how blessed and honoured I feel to be part of your tight-knit loving family." She stated that he taught her what "love of country means", as well as stating that it was "an honour to be your daughter-in-law" and that he is so "so missed and will be forever loved."

=== Greece ===
- The Prime Minister of Greece, Kyriakos Mitsotakis, reacted to the former king's death in a statement. He said of his death, "His passing is, on a human level, the formal epilogue to a chapter that was closed and done with the 1974 referendum." Mistotakis also gave Constantine's family his "sincere condolences".

=== Foreign ===
==== Reigning royalty ====
- Denmark – The Danish royal palace released a statement: "It is with great sadness that Her Majesty The Queen and the Royal Family have received the announcement that His Majesty King Constantine II of Greece passed away on Tuesday evening. The royal family's thoughts are currently with Her Majesty Queen Anne-Marie and the entire Greek family." It also said that flags would be flown at half mast at the Danish royal palace Amalienborg.

==== Non-reigning royalty ====
- Albania – In a statement on Twitter, Leka, Prince of Albania, said, "My sincere condolences to the Greek Royal Family for the passing of His Majesty King Constantine II. My prayers and thoughts are with His heir Crown Prince Pavlos of Greece and His esteemed family."
- Brazil – The Vassouras line of the House of Orléans-Braganza, who are one of the claimants to the Brazilian throne, commented, "The Brazilian Imperial Family and the Greek Royal Family have always maintained good relations, and their members meet at official ceremonies and family reunions. Therefore, Prince Dom Bertrand of Orléans-Braganza, Head of the Imperial House of Brazil, after being informed of the passing of King Constantine II, his distant cousin, sent on Wednesday, January 11, a message of condolence to his son and dynastic successor Prince Pavlos, Head of the Royal House of Greece."
- France – Jean, Count of Paris, issued a statement, "My wife and I are saddened to learn of the death of His Majesty King Constantine II of Greece. He was a brave man who faced years spent away from his country. King Constantine had placed the Hellenic flag at the center of his life and his hopes and it was in these lands that he lived his last moments. I send my condolences to Her Majesty Queen Anne-Marie and their children and my most affectionate thoughts at this painful time."
- Iran – Reza Pahlavi issued, "The late King Constantine was a man of great integrity who served his people and his nation. From a young age, I was witness to the warmth His late Majesty and Queen Anne-Marie showed my parents and the affection they had for our nation. Our families always felt a special bond as the children of two of the world's greatest civilizations. In the years since the tragic change in our own country, I had the occasion to visit with the late King on many occasions and I will always remember our time together fondly. I offer my sincere condolences to Her Majesty Queen Anne-Marie, His Highness Crown Prince Pavlos, Her Majesty Queen Sofía of Spain, and the Greek people for their loss."
- Romania – A statement on the Romanian royal family's website and social media read, "The Royal Family of Romania learned with much distress of the passing of His Majesty King Constantine II of the Hellenes. King Constantine was in all his life close to the Royal Family of Romania, to Queen Helen, his father's sister, as well as to King Michael I and Queen Anne. The Custodian of the Crown, as well as Princesses Elena, Irina, Sophie and Maria, have known their uncle since their early childhood. For more than seven decades, the two families always met in Greece, and then Switzerland, in Great Britain as well as in various European capitals, at public or private events. King Constantine was Her Majesty Margareta's Godfather and also Godfather at the Orthodox wedding of the Custodian of the Crown and Prince Radu, in Lausanne, in 1996. King Constantine, like all his family, was always faithfully present at all the important events, be they happy or sad, of the Royal Family of Romania. May God rest him in peace!"
- Russia – Grand Duke George Mikhailovich of Russia issued, "Eternal memory to my Godfather His Majesty King Konstantinos II of the Hellenes. May Lord welcome your soul in His Kingdom."
- Serbia – A bigger statement on their website of the Serbian royal family said, "HRH Crown Prince Alexander and the Royal family of Serbia send their condolences and deepest sympathy to HM Queen Anne-Marie, late King's sisters HM Queen Sophia of Spain, and HRH Princess Irene of Greece, his children HRH Crown Prince Pavlos, HRH Princess Alexia, HRH Prince Nikolaos, HRH Princess Theodora, and HRH Prince Philippos, and all the other members of the Royal family of Greece for their extremely sad loss. During these most difficult moments, the Royal Family of Serbia shares grief and pain for the passing of His Majesty and sends prayers to the Lord to remember the late King in His mercy. HM King Constantine II will be greatly missed, but the memory of him will be kept forever, with great love and respect."

==== Others ====
- In a statement on its website, International Olympic Committee President Thomas Bach said, "In King Constantine we have lost a great friend of sport. He was a fellow Olympic Champion and, whenever we met, we shared our passion about sport and discussed our love of Olympism and the life of an athlete. He was always interested in the development of the Olympic Movement, and our conversations were very enriching. I will greatly miss these always friendly meetings. Our thoughts are with Queen Anne-Marie and with the entire family." The IOC also announced the Olympic flag would be flown at half-mast at Olympic House in Lausanne for three days as a "mark of respect".
- The Ecumenical Patriarch of Constantinople Bartholomew I sent a condolence letter to Crown Prince Pavlos and spoke with him over the phone. He also performed a Trisagion prayer during a memorial service in Constantine's honour.
- John Koudounis of the National Hellenic Museum stated, "On behalf of the Koudounis family and the National Hellenic Museum, I wish to express my sincere condolences to my dear friend, Prince Nikolaos of Greece, the creator of Resilience, on the passing of his father, HM King Constantine II. Our sympathies are with HM Queen Anne-Marie, Prince Nikolaos, Princess Tatiana, Crown Prince Pavlos and Crown Princess Marie-Chantal and their families."

== Thanksgiving service ==
On 10 January 2024, the first anniversary of Constantine's death, a private memorial service was held in Tatoi and was attended by his immediate family. On 27 February, a thanksgiving service at St George's Chapel, Windsor Castle, was held by the British royal family and attended by Constantine's family, members of foreign royal families and both former and present members of British parliament. The Protestant service was officiated by Christopher Cocksworth, Dean of Windsor. Greek Orthodox representation was also present at the service. Readings were conducted by all five of Constantine's children and Archbishop Nikitas Loulias, the Archbishop of Thyateira and Great Britain. Constantine's eulogy was delivered by Nicholas Soames, which he described as a "great and humbling honour". After the Lord's Prayer was read in English and in Greek, the British national anthem was sung to conclude the service. Five of Constantine's grandchildren, King Charles III and Constantine's two British godchildren, Prince William and Lady Gabriella Kingston, were not present. William was due to give a reading at the ceremony, but pulled out shortly before the ceremony commenced for an undisclosed "personal matter". Gabriella's husband had died two days prior to the service. Charles, who was unable to attend due to his cancer treatment, was spotted honouring Constantine by wearing a Greek tie days later. The day following the thanksgiving service, a memorial service was held in the Saint Sophia Cathedral and officiated by Archbishop Nikitas. ANT1 reporters were present and interviewed both Crown Prince Pavlos and Prince Nikolaos.

== Thanksgiving service dignitaries ==
=== Immediate family ===
- Queen Anne-Marie, the late King's widow
  - Princess Alexia and Carlos Morales Quintana, the late King's daughter and son-in-law
  - Crown Prince Pavlos and Crown Princess Marie-Chantal, the late King's son and daughter-in-law
  - Prince Nikolaos and Princess Tatiana, the late King's son and daughter-in-law
  - Princess Theodora and Matthew Kumar, the late King's daughter and her fiancé
  - Prince Philippos and Princess Nina, the late King's son and daughter-in-law
- Queen Sofía and King Juan Carlos I of Spain, the late King's sister and brother-in-law
  - (Spain) The Duchess of Lugo, the late King's niece
  - Infanta Cristina of Spain, the late King's niece
    - (Spain) Juan Urdangarin y Borbón, the late King's grandnephew
  - The King and Queen of Spain, the late King's nephew and his wife
- Princess Irene, the late King's sister
- Sophie and Humphrey Voelcker, the late King's first cousin once removed and her husband
- Nicholas and Sophie Brandram, the late King's first cousin once removed and his wife
- Alexia and Will Hicks, the late King's first cousin once removed and her husband
- (Denmark) The Dowager Princess of Sayn-Wittgenstein-Berleburg, the late King's sister-in-law
  - (Denmark) The Prince and Princess of Sayn-Wittgenstein-Berleburg, the late King's nephew by marriage and his wife
  - (Denmark) Princess Alexandra of Sayn-Wittgenstein-Berleburg and Count Michael Ahlefeldt-Laurvig-Bille, the late King's niece by marriage and her husband

=== Other royal dignitaries ===
==== Members of reigning royal houses ====
- Queen Noor of Jordan
- Prince Constantijn of the Netherlands, the late King's fourth cousin once removed and godson (Queen Anne-Marie's half-third cousin)
- The Queen of the United Kingdom, wife of the late King's second cousin
- (United Kingdom) The Princess Royal and Vice-Admiral Sir Timothy Laurence, the late King's second cousin and her husband
  - (United Kingdom) Zara and Michael Tindall, the late King's second cousin once removed and her husband
- (United Kingdom) The Duke of York and Sarah, Duchess of York, the late King's second cousin and his former wife
  - (United Kingdom) Princess Beatrice and Edoardo Mapelli Mozzi, the late King's second cousin once removed and her husband
- (United Kingdom) The Duke and Duchess of Gloucester, the late King's third cousin and his wife
- (United Kingdom) The Duke of Kent, the late King's second cousin
  - (United Kingdom) Earl and Countess of St Andrews, the late King's second cousin once removed and his wife
  - (United Kingdom) Lady Helen Taylor, the late King's second cousin once removed
- (United Kingdom) Princess Alexandra, The Hon. Lady Ogilvy, the late King's second cousin
  - (United Kingdom) Marina Ogilvy, the late King's second cousin once removed
- (United Kingdom) Prince and Princess Michael of Kent, the late King's second cousin and his wife
- (United Kingdom) Lady Sarah and Daniel Chatto, the late King's third cousin once removed and her husband
- (United Kingdom) The Countess Mountbatten of Burma, wife of the late King's third cousin once removed
  - (United Kingdom) Lady Alexandra and Thomas Hooper, the late King's third cousin twice removed and her husband

==== Members of non-reigning royal houses ====
- The Margrave and Margravine of Baden, the late King's second cousin once removed and his wife
- The Prince of Preslav, the late King's fifth cousin
- The Hereditary Prince and Hereditary Princess of Hanover, the late King's first cousin once removed and his wife
- Crown Prince Alexander and Crown Princess Katherine of Yugoslavia, the late King's first cousin once removed and his wife

=== Others ===
- The Archbishop of Thyateira and Great Britain
- The Lord and Lady Cavendish of Furness
- Sir Rocco Forte
- Lady Susan Hussey
- John Kerry, former USA Secretary of State
- Sir John and Dame Norma Major, former British prime minister and his wife
- The Lord and Lady Soames of Fletching
- Sir Jackie Stewart
- Alexandra von Fürstenberg and Dax Miller, sister of the late King's daughter-in-law, Marie-Chantal, and her husband
