= A Taste of Greece =

A Taste of Greece: Recipes, Cuisine & Culture
- Front cover of A Taste of Greece
- Editors: HRH Princess Tatiana, Diana Farr Louis
- Language: English
- Subject: Greek cuisine
- Genre: Cookbook
- Published: Germany
- Publisher: TeNeues
- Publication date: July 2016
- Publication place: Greece
- Pages: 208 pp.
- ISBN: 978-3-8327-3337-7
- Website: www.teneues.com

A Taste of Greece: Recipes, Cuisine & Culture is an illustrated cookbook coordinated by Princess Tatiana of Greece and edited by the food writer Diana Farr Louis. It is a non-profit publication whose sales benefit the Greek charity Boroume ("we can!"), supporting food supplies both to refugees in Greece and to Greeks suffering poverty due to the country's economic crisis. The idea of publishing a book of this kind originated with the founder of Boroume, Xenia Papastavrou, according to Maria Karamitsos. Daisy Dunn, reviewing A Taste of Greece in The Spectator, commented that "Greece’s food crisis has wrought such feelings of exclusion and isolation as can only exist in a culture that has always placed food at the centre of civilisation. Over 17 per cent of the population of Greece is said to be suffering from food insecurity."

The book is a collection of favourite Greek recipes contributed by 41 celebrities, chefs and food writers, all of them connected with Greece in different ways. Contributors are arranged alphabetically, but the list includes celebrities such as Arianna Huffington, Jim Gianopulos of 20th Century Fox, writers Margaret Atwood, Victoria Hislop and Sofka Zinovieff, conductor Zubin Mehta, broadcasters Bob Costas and Nikos Aliagas, photographer Robert McCabe, actresses Rita Wilson and Olympia Dukakis; design and food entrepreneurs such as Carole Bamford, Dan and Dean Caten, Tatiana Casiraghi; chefs Michel Roux, Nobu Matsuhisa, Cat Cora and Nikos Ntanos who worked on recipes for several other contributors; food writers Diana Farr Louis (who edited the book), Diane Kochilas, Laurie Constantino, Rachel and Andrew Dalby, Peter Minaki. Among the contributors are several members of the ousted Greek royal family now once again living in Greece: Queen Anne-Marie, her sister-in-law Princess Irene, her son Prince Nikolaos and his wife Princess Tatiana who coordinated the project. When she was still Tatiana Blatnik she had worked for Diane von Furstenberg, who is a contributor to the book alongside other contacts from the fashion world, Mary Katrantzou, Valentino and Giancarlo Giammetti, as noted by Sharon Edelson writing in WWD.

A Taste of Greece was published internationally in July 2016 by TeNeues Media, based in Germany, with branches in the United States, United Kingdom and France.
