= Queen Anne-Marie of Greece =

Queen of Greece from 1964 to 1973

Anne-Marie
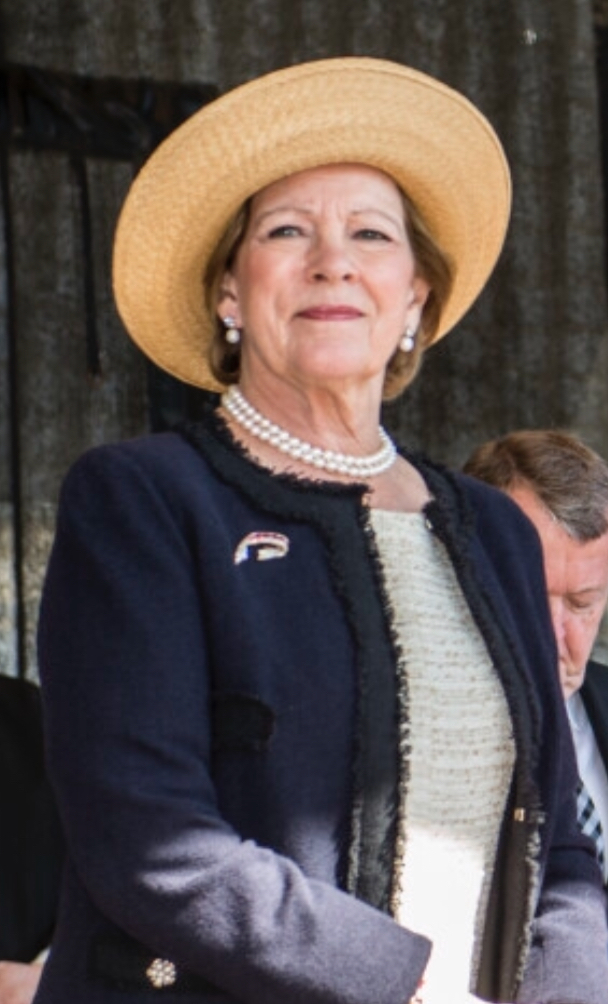
- Anne-Marie in 2018

Queen consort of the Hellenes
- Tenure: 18 September 1964 – 1 June 1973
- Born: Princess Anne-Marie of Denmark; 30 August 1946 (age 80); Amalienborg Palace, Copenhagen, Denmark
- Spouse: Constantine II of Greece (m. 1964; died 2023)
- Issue: Princess Alexia; Pavlos, Crown Prince of Greece; Prince Nikolaos; Princess Theodora; Prince Philippos
Names
- Anne-Marie Dagmar Ingrid
- House: Glücksburg
- Father: Frederik IX of Denmark
- Mother: Ingrid of Sweden

Anne-Marie (Greek: Άννα-Μαρία, romanized: Ánna-María; born Princess Anne-Marie Dagmar Ingrid of Denmark, 30 August 1946) is a Danish princess who was Queen of Greece as the consort of King Constantine II from their marriage on 18 September 1964 until the abolition of the Greek monarchy on 1 June 1973.

Anne-Marie is the youngest daughter of Frederik IX of Denmark and Ingrid of Sweden. In 1964, she married Constantine and became queen consort of Greece. They had five children: Princess Alexia, Crown Prince Pavlos, Prince Nikolaos, Princess Theodora, and Prince Philippos. As queen, Anne-Marie spent much of her time working for a charitable foundation known as "Her Majesty's Fund", a foundation established by her mother-in-law, Queen Frederica of Greece. In 1967, Anne-Marie and her family were forced into exile upon the rise of a military dictatorship. After fleeing to Rome, they eventually settled in London, when the Greek monarchy was officially abolished.

Anne-Marie and her family were stripped of their Greek citizenship and had their property revoked, leading them to sue in the European Court of Human Rights. From the compensation she earned, Anne-Marie set up the "Anne-Marie Foundation", which provided assistance to people in rural areas of Greece. In 2013, she and Constantine moved back to Greece. They moved to Athens in 2022, where Constantine died in January the following year.

== Birth and family ==
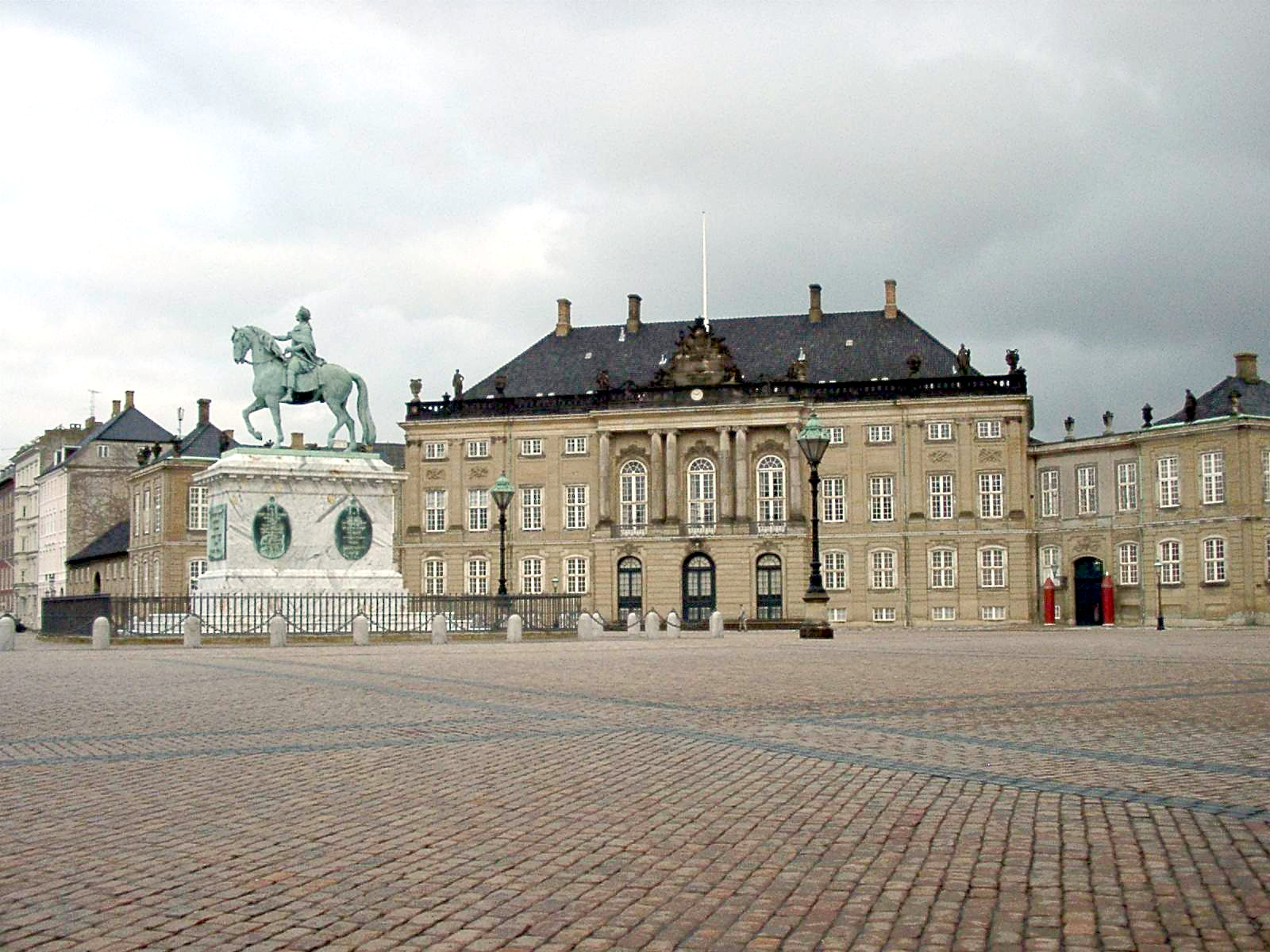
Frederik VIII's Palace at Amalienborg, Princess Anne-Marie's birthplace

Anne-Marie was born on 30 August 1946 at Frederik VIII's Palace, an 18th-century palace which forms part of the Amalienborg Palace complex in central Copenhagen. She was the third and last daughter and child of Crown Prince Frederik and Crown Princess Ingrid of Denmark. Her father was the eldest son of Christian X of Denmark and Alexandrine of Mecklenburg-Schwerin; her mother, born a princess of Sweden, was the only daughter of the Crown Prince of Sweden (later King Gustaf VI Adolf) and Princess Margaret of Connaught. At birth, Anne-Marie had two elder sisters: Princess Margrethe (later queen of Denmark) and Princess Benedikte (who became princess of Sayn-Wittgenstein-Berleburg).

Anne-Marie was baptised on 9 October at the Holmen Church in Copenhagen. Her godparents were her paternal grandparents, King Christian X and Queen Alexandrine of Denmark; her maternal grandfather, Crown Prince Gustaf Adolf of Sweden; her maternal uncle Prince Bertil, Duke of Halland; her paternal great-uncle King Haakon VII of Norway; her paternal great-aunt Princess Dagmar of Denmark; her grandfather's cousin Prince George of Greece and Denmark; her father's cousin, Crown Princess Märtha of Norway; Queen Mary of the United Kingdom; and Crown Princess Juliana of the Netherlands.

Anne-Marie is a great-great-granddaughter of both Queen Victoria and Christian IX of Denmark. Therefore, she is related to many other members of European royalty, such as her future husband Constantine II, who is also a great-great-grandchild of both Queen Victoria and Christian IX of Denmark. Moreover, Anne-Marie is the maternal aunt of Frederik X of Denmark, the first cousin of Carl XVI Gustaf of Sweden, and an aunt by marriage of Felipe VI of Spain.

== Early life ==
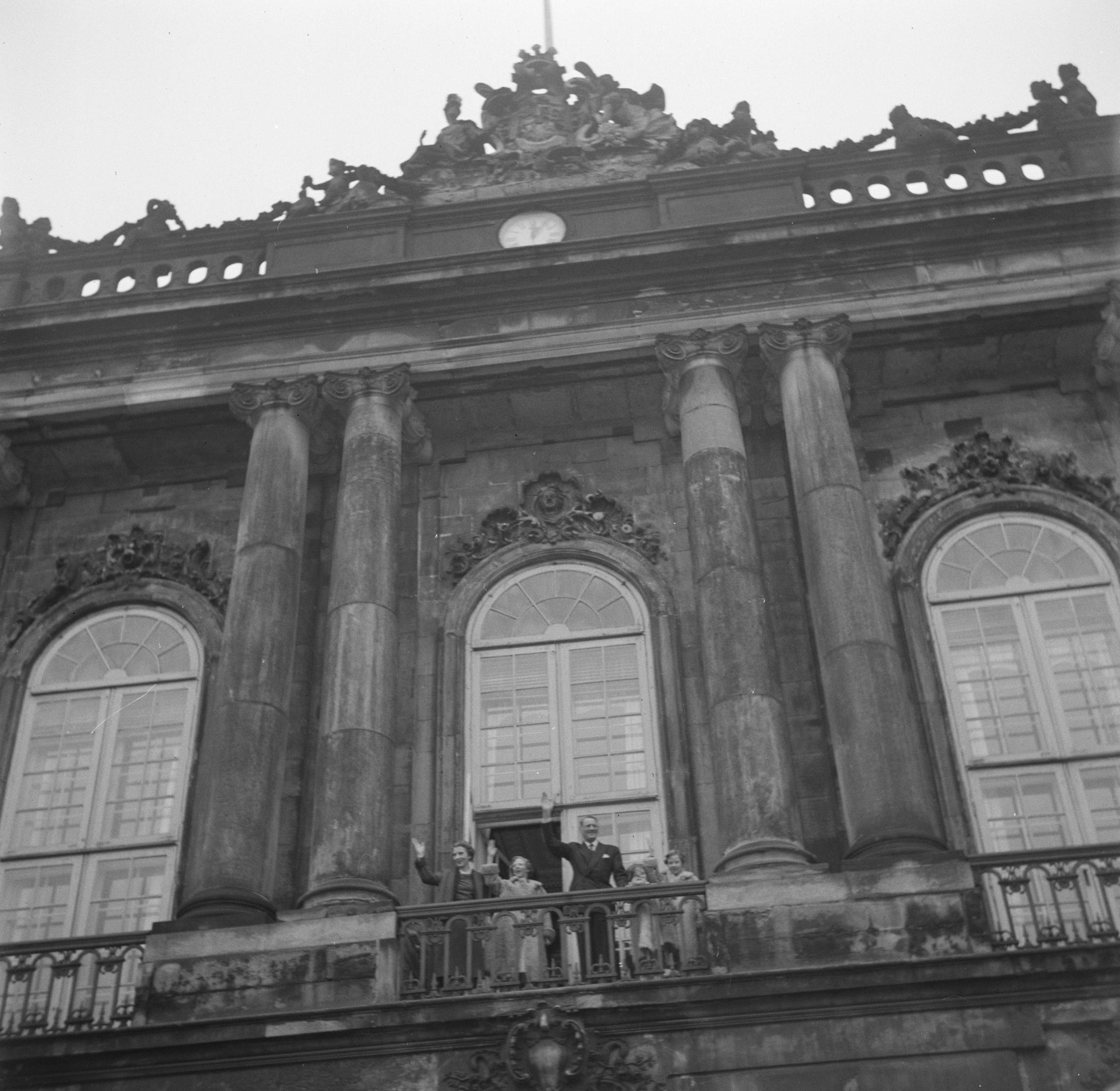
Princess Anne-Marie with the royal family on the balcony of Amalienborg Palace on her father's 55th birthday in 1954

Anne-Marie and her sisters grew up in apartments at Frederik VIII's Palace at Amalienborg in Copenhagen and in Fredensborg Palace in North Zealand. She spent summer holidays with the royal family in her parents' summer residence at Gråsten Palace in Southern Jutland. On 20 April 1947, less than a year after Anne-Marie's birth, her grandfather, Christian X, died, and her father ascended the throne as King Frederik IX.

At the time of her father's accession to the throne, only males could ascend the throne of Denmark. As Anne-Marie's parents had no sons, it was assumed that her paternal uncle, Prince Knud, would one day assume the throne. The popularity of Frederik IX and his daughters and the more prominent role of women in Danish life paved the way for a new Act of Succession in 1953 which permitted female succession to the throne following the principle of male-preference primogeniture, where a female can ascend to the throne if she has no brothers. Her eldest sister, Margrethe, therefore became heir presumptive, and Benedikte and Anne-Marie became second and third in the line of succession.

Anne-Marie was educated at N. Zahle's School, a private school in Copenhagen, from 1952 to 1961. In 1961, she attended the Chatelard School for Girls, an English boarding school outside Montreux in Switzerland. In 1963 and 1964, she attended the Institut Le Mesnil, a Swiss finishing school also in Montreux. Upon returning from schooling, Anne-Marie undertook childcare work for a few years. This was in approval of her mother, who wished for her to become a good housewife to her future husband.

== Marriage ==
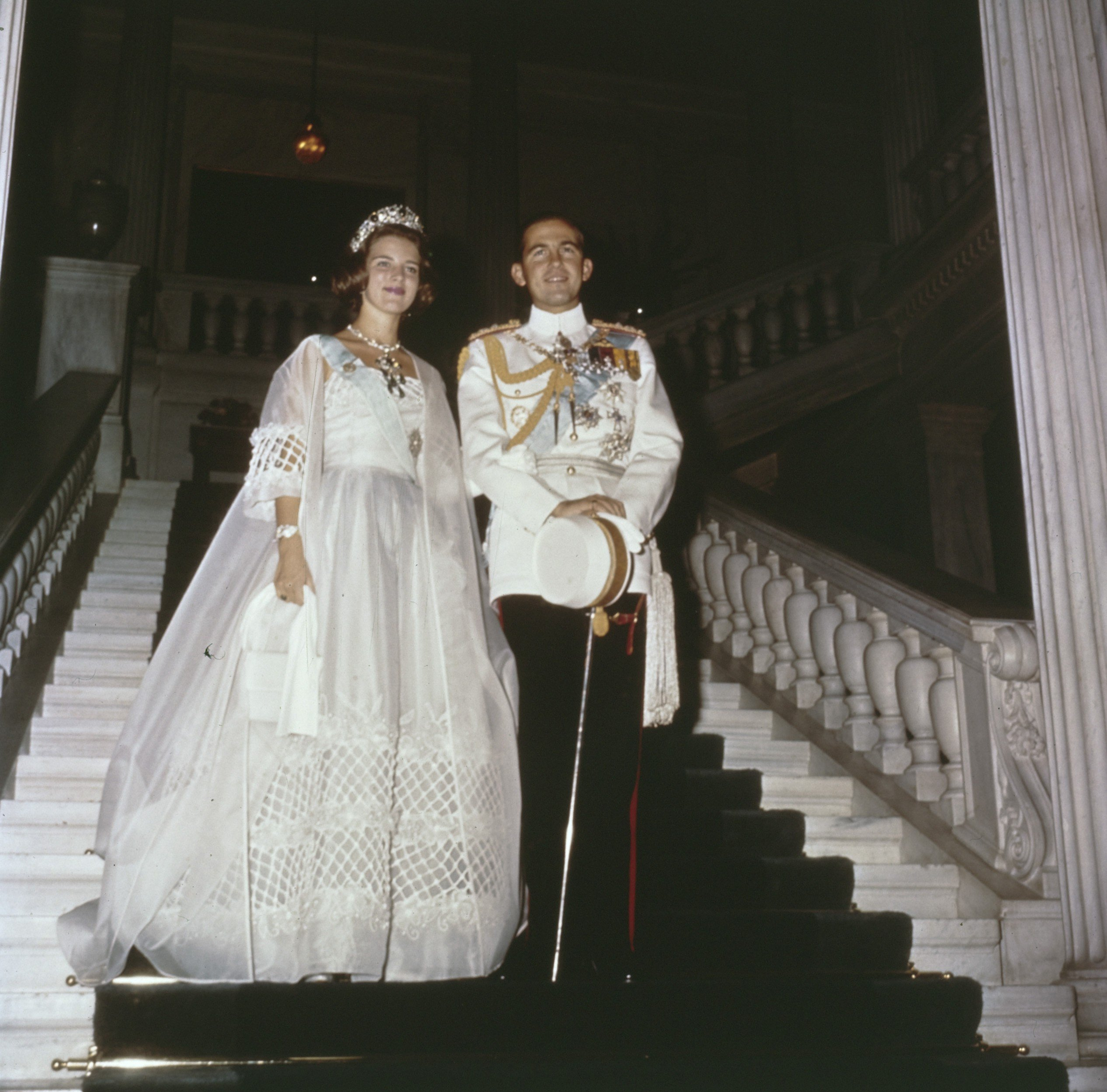
Constantine and Anne-Marie at their pre-wedding gala at the Royal Palace, 1964

In 1959, at the age of 13, Anne-Marie first met her future husband, her third cousin Constantine, Crown Prince of Greece, who accompanied his parents, King Paul and Queen Frederica, on a state visit to Denmark. Constantine at the time was 19 years old. They met a second time in Denmark in 1961, when Constantine declared to his parents his intention to marry Anne-Marie. The pair became secretly engaged without telling the public nor members of their families due to Frederik IX's opposition to their relationship because of her young age. They met again in Athens in May 1962 at the wedding of Constantine's older sister, Princess Sophia of Greece and Denmark, and Prince Juan Carlos of Spain. Anne-Marie was a bridesmaid, while Constantine was a groomsman for the future monarchs of Spain. The couple spent time in Athens afterward and told their families about their engagement. They met again in 1963 at the centenary celebrations of the Greek monarchy. Though it had already been revealed to their family, their engagement was announced to the public during these celebrations. Following this, Anne-Marie began studying the history of Greece and the history of the Greek monarchy, as well as taking Modern Greek lessons in order to learn the language of the country her husband was to reign over.

Constantine's mother, Frederica, initially requested that one million dollars be spent on the wedding, however, the private office of the Danish royal family denied this. The Danish and Greek royal families eventually agreed on two million dollars being invested in the wedding. Prior to it being spent, this money was stored in the Swiss banking system. In July 1964, the announcement of the engagement of Constantine and Anne-Marie raised the polite protests of the Left in Denmark. Previously, on 6 March 1964, King Paul died, and Constantine succeeded him as King of the Hellenes. There was speculation that as a result of Paul's death, the wedding would be postponed and delayed. However, Frederica requested that their marriage take place on its original date. Anne-Marie and Constantine were married on 18 September 1964 (two weeks after Anne-Marie's 18th birthday) in the Metropolis, the Greek Orthodox Cathedral of Athens. Anne-Marie converted from Lutheranism to the Greek Orthodox Church on 21 April 1965, seven months and three days after her marriage, with special permission from the Archbishop of Athens and all Greece, in order for her to be able to celebrate the Easter, which was four days later.

As she was marrying a foreign ruler, consent to the marriage was given on the condition that Anne-Marie renounce her succession rights to the Danish throne for herself and her descendants.

== Queen of the Hellenes ==
As Queen of Greece, Anne-Marie's initial primary role was to provide the nation with an heir who would eventually take over as King. Anne-Marie spent much of her time working for a charitable foundation known as "Her Majesty's Fund" and later as the "Anne-Marie Foundation", which provided assistance to people in rural areas of Greece. Her Majesty's Fund was an organisation set up by Frederica during her husband's reign which aimed at assisting the poor and disadvantaged. Anne-Marie also worked closely with the Red Cross and other not-for-profit charities.

On 10 July 1965, Queen Anne-Marie gave birth at the villa Mon Repos in Corfu to her first child, Princess Alexia, who was heir presumptive to the throne of Greece, from her birth until the birth of her younger brother Crown Prince Pavlos on 20 May 1967 in accordance with Greece's order of succession adhering to male-preference primogeniture. At the time of Alexia and Pavlos' births, political stability within Greece was diminishing due to a schism between Constantine and the Prime Minister Georgios Papandreou, who wished to demote the minister of defence, Petros Garoufalias, in order to assume office himself. A falling out resulting in Papandreou's resignation then ensued.

A group of Greek soldiers in April 1967 overthrew the government of the new Prime Minister, Panagiotis Kanellopoulos, which marked the beginning of a military dictatorship in Greece. The royal family was left unaware and in order to avoid fighting, Constantine and Anne-Marie agreed to recognise the dictatorship against their will, however many members of the public therefore believed that they supported and even funded the coup. The following month, Anne-Marie gave birth to a son, Pavlos, who immediately assumed the position of Crown Prince of Greece from his sister. At his baptism, Anne-Marie and Constantine decided to make Frederica his godmother and the Hellenic Army his godfather figure. Many people viewed this decision as the royal family's recognition of the military dictatorship. As a result of the military coup, relations between Athens and Copenhagen had been deteriorating and in an attempt to salvage "national security", no member of the Danish royal family was permitted to attend the baptism. Margrethe II of Denmark, the future queen of Denmark, was married to Henri de Laborde de Monpezat at their wedding on 10 June 1967. Anne-Marie, the sister of Margrethe, and Constantine were subsequently denied an invite to their wedding, further ruining relations for a period of time.

== Exile ==
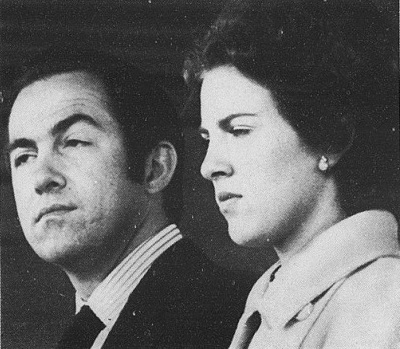
Anne-Marie and Constantine attending a horse show in Rome during their exile in Italy

In December 1967, Constantine attempted to shake off the military's authoritarian regime by trying to stage a counter-coup with the help of his political allies. The counter-coup failed. Upon the coup's abandonment, the military junta in Greece strongly advised Anne-Marie and Constantine to leave the country. Without leaving them any real options when saying this, they were essentially forcing them to be exiled from the country. Anne-Marie and Constantine fled to nearby Italy and sought refuge at the Greek Embassy in Rome, where Anne-Marie and Constantine became puppet monarchs. After two months of refuge at the Greek Embassy, Anne-Marie and Constantine received greeting from Moritz, Landgrave of Hesse, who organised to put them up at the Villa Polissena, an Italian palace where Moritz himself had previously lived upon his family's exile. Anne-Marie eventually agreed with Constantine to move to 13 Via di Porta Latina, where a large villa owned by Countess Cristina Paolozzi was located. The couple rented out the space at 8,000 francs per month for the next five years.

Possibly due to stress and worry, Anne-Marie suffered a miscarriage in early 1968. Anne-Marie fell pregnant again in February of the next year and gave birth to Prince Nikolaos of Greece and Denmark. Anne-Marie and Constantine established a small school in their villa to preserve the Greek culture among their children. Despite the expansion of their family, Anne-Marie and Constantine had been experiencing some marital struggles in the early 1970s. It was reported that Anne-Marie in 1974 was considering filing for divorce and moving back to Denmark, however, their relationship was repaired and even "strengthened" as a result.

Throughout this time, although they were living in exile, Anne-Marie and Constantine still formally remained the monarchs of Greece. They were paid monthly by the military junta, but lacked invitations to Greek governmental events. They were still allowed to represent Greece and the Greek crown at international royal events. For example, the pair attended the 21st birthday of Charles, Prince of Wales, in 1969, the 2500th anniversary of the founding of the Persian Empire in 1971, and the baptism in Madrid of François, the eldest son of Alfonso, Duke of Anjou and Cádiz. One of the last events Anne-Marie and Constantine attended as the monarchs of Greece was the funeral of Frederik IX, Anne-Marie's father, whom she grieved deeply.

== Dethronement ==
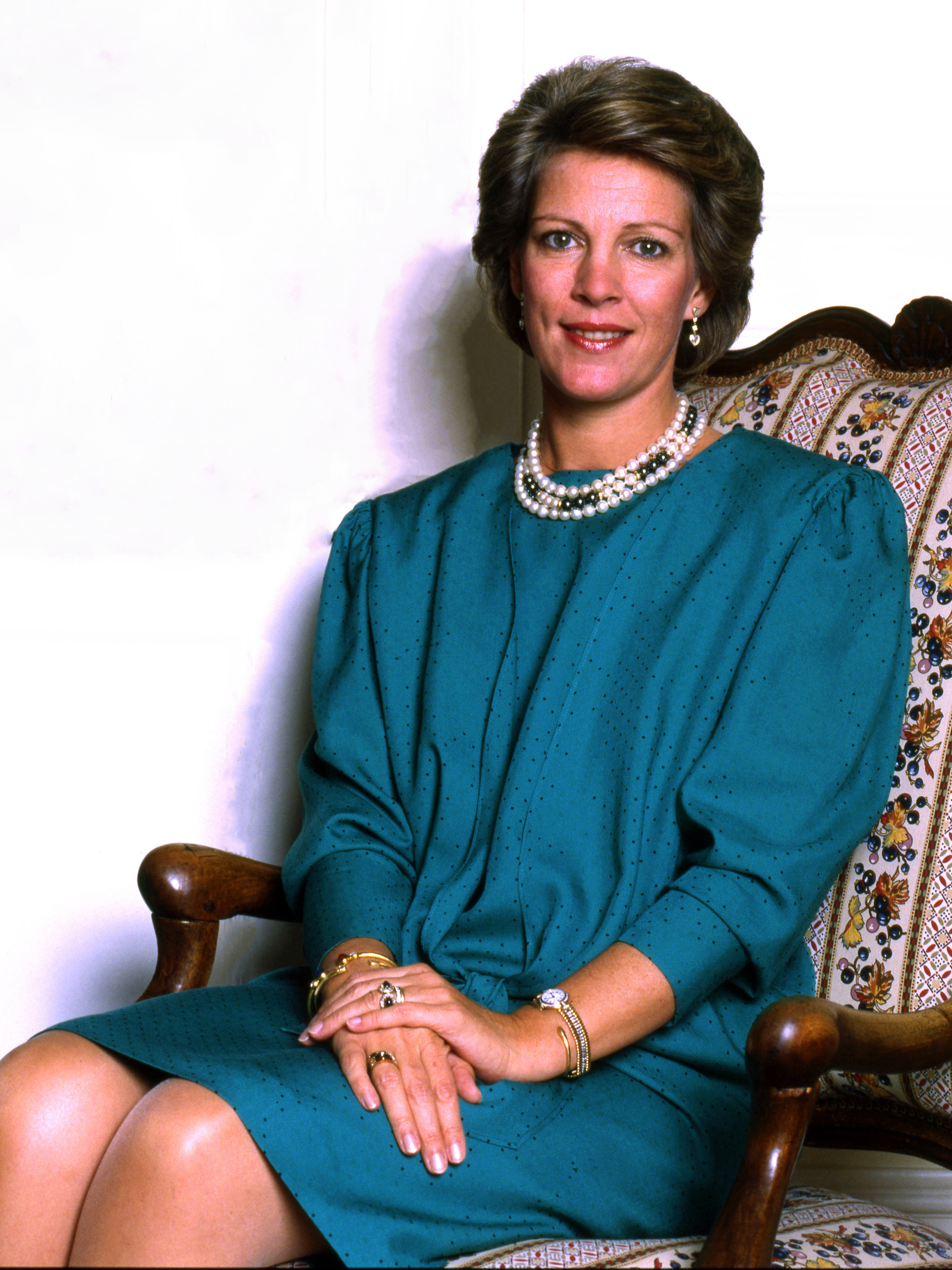
Portrait by Allan Warren, 1987

The military junta in Greece began noticeably distancing itself from the monarchy when Georgios Zoitakis replaced Georgios Papadopoulos as the Regent of Greece. In 1972, Constantine's face was replaced on coins by a phoenix, a symbol of the Greek military and the national bird of Greece.(Palmer & Greece 1990, p. 114) There began a period of growing uprise against the military dictatorship, which resulted in the abolition of the monarchy in 1973. Anne-Marie and Constantine were officially dethroned by the 1974 Greek republic referendum on 29 July 1974. The royal family were stripped of their monthly payments from the government, forcing them to leave their home in Rome. Margrethe II immediately agreed to house Anne-Marie, Constantine and their family in Amalienborg for a year. Anne-Marie moved with her family to England. They lived first in Chobham in Surrey. Later, they moved to the London suburb of Hampstead.

The military dictatorship in Greece collapsed in 1974 after a failed coup d'état, which aimed to unite Greece and Cyprus. The failed coup directly resulted in the 1974 Turkish invasion of Cyprus, which brought great opposition to the Greek junta. It was hoped that their positions as King and Queen of the Hellenes would be restored as democracy was reinstated, but another referendum confirmed that the monarchy would stay abolished and the Third Hellenic Republic was finally formed. The new Greek government continued to enforce the exile of Anne-Marie and her family as they saw them as a threat to the new republic. The family were disallowed to enter the country from then on. They were denied entry into the country even for Frederica's funeral. Frederica had died in exile in February 1981 in Madrid, where she had been staying with her daughter, Sofía. The Spanish royal family and Spanish government intervened and gained authorisation for the Greek royals to return for only one day, the day of the funeral.

In London, Anne-Marie established with Constantine the Hellenic College of London to again help their children learn the Greek language and culture. The family continued to earn support from the Spanish royal family, Danish royal family, British royal family, Swedish royal family and Norwegian royal family. Anne-Marie and Constantine received financial aid from Hussein of Jordan and Mohammad Reza Pahlavi, the Shah of Iran. Following a miscarriage in 1980, Anne-Marie and Constantine agreed to expand their family. After the christening of Prince Peter of Yugoslavia, whom Anne-Marie and Constantine baptised, the couple welcomed Princess Theodora in June 1983 and later Prince Philippos in April 1986. In 1989, the silver anniversary of Anne-Marie's marriage to Constantine was celebrated at Kronborg Castle in Denmark.

== Return to Greece ==
The government of Greece in 1991 granted Anne-Marie and Constantine permission to retrieve over 68 tonnes of their belongings to either keep or sell. These objects had previously been abandoned in Tatoi Palace and Mon Repos Palace when the monarchs were exiled 23 years earlier. Two years later, the couple were allowed to enter Greece again in a private visit on their yacht with their children. They had agreed with the government to avoid touristic and populated areas. When the family stopped for oil at a port in southern Greece, Anne-Marie and Constantine were swarmed with crowds of people and press, who greeted them with cheers and claps. As a result, the Greek government sent naval destroyers and a Lockheed C-130 Hercules aircraft. This was called evidence that the pair still held "real influence in Greece". The family were subsequently escorted by members of the military, before being obliged to sail out of Greek maritime borders.

Possibly as a result of their 1993 visit, Prime Minister Andreas Papandreou confiscated all property of the exiled royal family, including Tatoi, Mon Repos and Psychico, a farm located on Mount Hymettus. All tangible items that the family had not evacuated in 1991 were also taken from them by the government. Finally, the government stripped the Greek royal family of their Greek citizenship and passport, unless they renounced their dynastic rights, abandoned the name "of Greece" and swore an oath to the republic. Anne-Marie and Constantine called it "the greatest insult in this world for a Greek to be told that he is not a Greek". In addition, they were accused by the Greek government of tampering with the 1974 republic referendum results by officiating the marriage of Pavlos and Marie-Chantal Miller in London as a real princely marriage.

Anne-Marie and Constantine, along with Princess Irene and Princess Katherine, made the decision to take the Greek government to court in April 1996 over the confiscation of their citizenships and properties. The Supreme Civil and Criminal Court of Greece agreed with their discrimination claim, however, the Council of State overrode their decision and stated that the removal of their passports was a measure taken that conforms with the constitution of the Third Republic. As a result, the family took Greece to court in the European Court of Human Rights and sued them for €200 million. Months after the initiation of the claim, the court ruled in the royal family's favour in November 2000. The ruling, however, did not require the government to return the family's properties and instead allowed them to be compensated through money. Of the €200 million claim, Anne-Marie and Constantine won €12 million, Irene won €900,000 and Katherine €300,000. Possibly in an attempt to villainise the former monarchs, their payments were taken out of the natural disaster relief fund. In 2003, Constantine used the money they received to establish the Anna-Maria Foundation, a not-for-profit organisation aimed to provide aid to victims of natural disasters, particularly those of floods, earthquakes and bushfires. Since 2019, Anne-Marie has headed the foundation as its president. The family did not receive their citizenship back either. Although originally requesting Spanish citizenships, Anne-Marie eventually requested from her sister, Margrethe II, to have Danish diplomatic passports established in the names of the members of the Greek royal family. She agreed and in their Danish passports, their names were established as "HM Queen Anne-Marie" and "HM King Constantine II".

== Later life ==
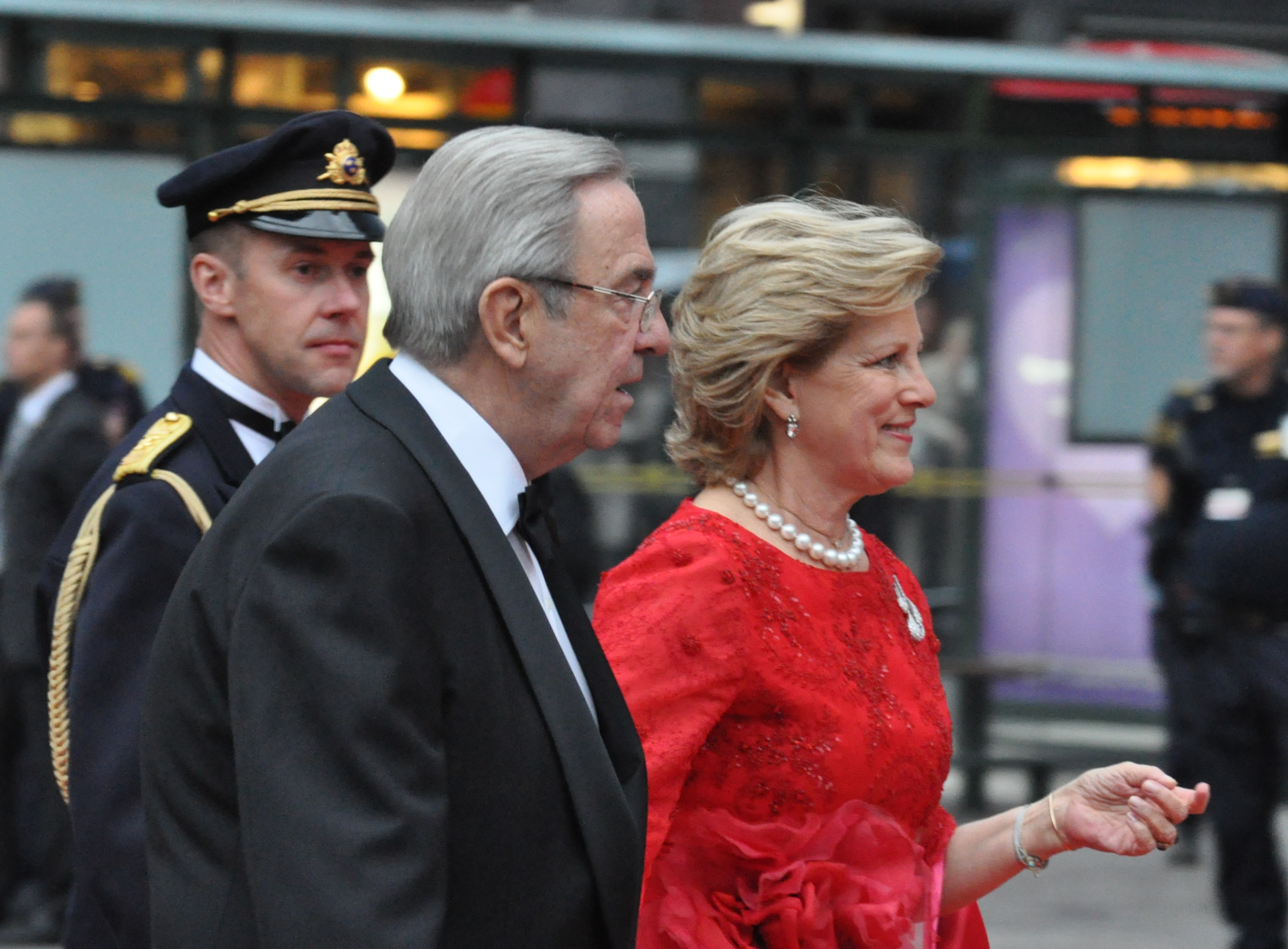
Anne-Marie and Constantine in Stockholm at the wedding of Victoria, Crown Princess of Sweden, June 2010

Following the resolution of the disputes, relations between the Greek royal family and the Greek government began to relax. On 14 August 2004, Anne-Marie and her husband Constantine visited their former home in Athens, the former Royal Palace, which is now the Presidential Palace, for the first time since 1967. They were received by then-President of Greece Costis Stephanopoulos along with other members of the International Olympic Committee, of which Constantine was an honorary member. In December 2004, Constantine, Anne-Marie and their children were again invited to pay a personal private visit by President Stephanopoulos. Once the games concluded, the government announced that Anne-Marie and Constantine's exile would finally be revoked.

In 2013, Anne-Marie and Constantine sold their home in London for €11.5 million and announced their return to Greece. The couple purchased a villa in Porto Cheli, Peloponnese, residing there until they relocated to Athens in the spring of 2022. For her 60th birthday, Anne-Marie boarded the cruise ship the Aphroessa, which Constantine had organised for her.

Constantine began experiencing health and mobility issues, leading to him requiring more care from Anne-Marie. He was hospitalised following his COVID-19 diagnosis. On 10 January 2023, Anne-Marie became widowed when her husband died of a stroke at the private Hygeia Hospital in Athens at the age of 82.

On 19 December 2024, Anne-Marie's children and five of her grandchildren applied for Greek citizenship, selecting the surname "Ντε Γκρες" (De Grèce; "of Greece"). Anne-Marie did not apply, with it being reported that she was "not interested".

== Titles, styles, honours, and arms ==
=== Titles and styles ===
She has been the titular Queen of the Hellenes since 1973. This title is not recognized under the terms of the republican Constitution of Greece.

- 30 August 1946 – 18 September 1964: Her Royal Highness Princess Anne-Marie of Denmark
- 18 September 1964 – 1 June 1973: Her Majesty The Queen
- 1 June 1973 – present: Her Majesty Queen Anne-Marie, former Queen of the Hellenes

=== Honours ===
==== National ====
- Denmark:
  - Knight of the Order of the Elephant (R.E.)
  - Commemorative medal on Margrethe II's 25th anniversary of her reign.
  - Commemorative medal on Queen Margrethe's and Prince Henrik's silver wedding anniversary (S.E.m).
  - Commemorative medal on the centenary of Frederik IX's birth (M.M.11.marts 1899-1999).
  - Memorial medal on the centenary of Christian X's birth (M.M. 26.sept. 1870–1970)
  - Queen Ingrid's Memorial Medal (Dr.I.M.M.)
  - Recipient of the Queen Margrethe II Golden Jubilee Medal (14 January 2022)
- (Greece) Greek Royal Family:
  - Knight Grand Cross of the Royal Order of the Redeemer
  - Grand Mistress & Dame Grand Cross of the Royal Family Order of Saints Olga and Sophia
  - Grand Mistress Dame Grand Cross of the Royal Order of Beneficence
  - Centennial Memorial Medal of the Greek Royal Family

==== Foreign ====
- (Iran) Iranian Imperial Family: Recipient of the Commemorative Medal of the 2,500 year Celebration of the Persian Empire.
- Netherlands: Recipient of Wedding Medal of Princess Beatrix and Claus van Amsberg.
- Sweden: Recipient of the Commemorative Golden Jubilee Medal of His Majesty The King.
- Thailand: King Rama IX Royal Cypher Medal, First Class.

=== Arms and monogram ===
Coats of Arms of Queen Anne-Marie of Greece	Personal Monogram of Queen Anne-Marie of Greece	Dual Cypher of King Constantine II and Queen Anne-Marie of Greece	Dual Cypher of King Constantine II and Queen Anne-Marie of Greece

The coats of arms of Queen Anne-Marie combine the 1936–1973 royal coat of arms of Greece and the 1948–1972 coat of arms of Denmark which was current at the time of her marriage in 1964. The Danish coat of arms is almost identical with the dynastic arms inescutcheon in the Greek coat of arms, which equals the Danish coat of arms of 1819–1903. The only difference is that the Greek arms also include Iceland's white stockfish on red in the lower dexter corner.

== Issue ==
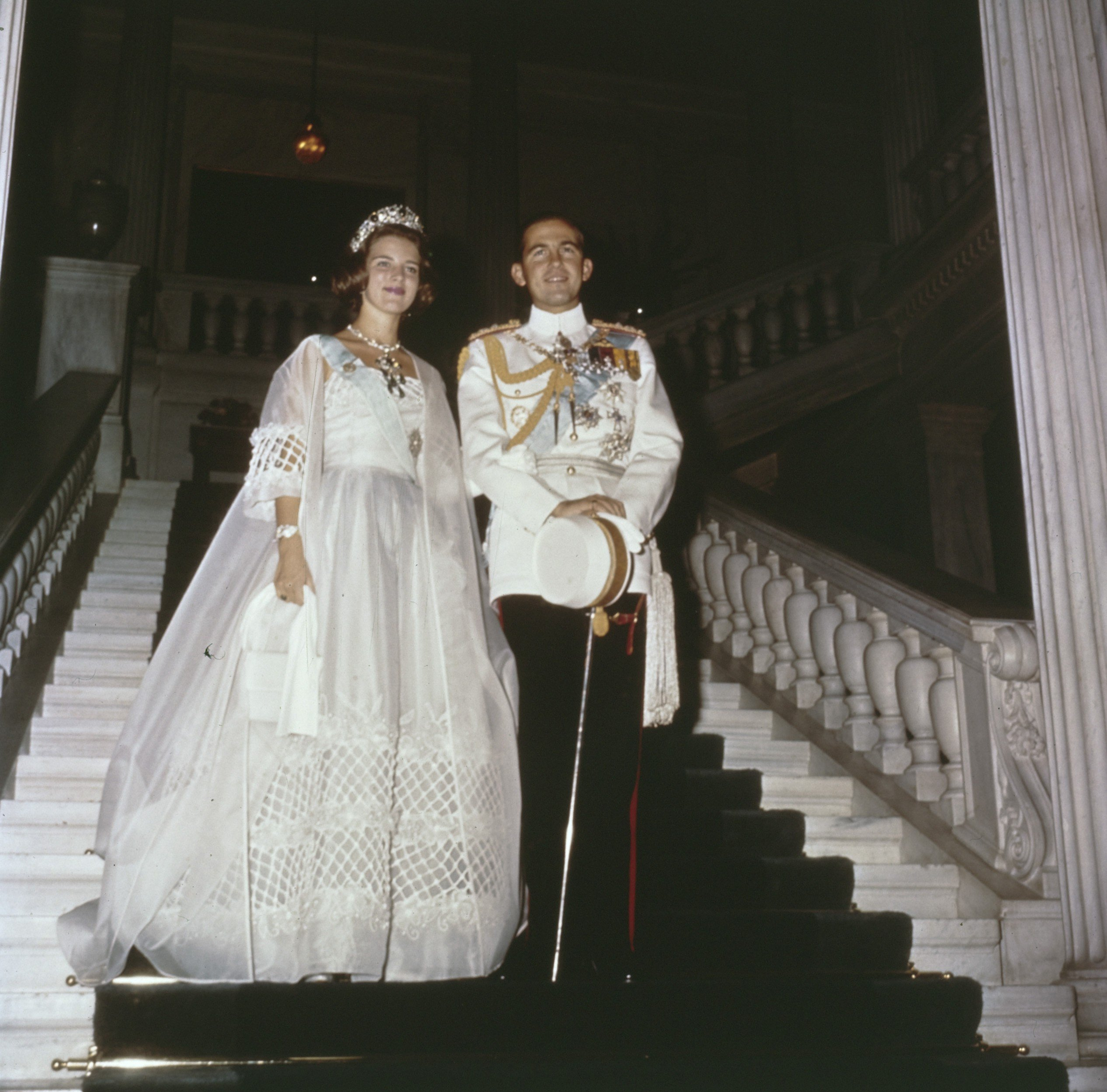
Constantine and Anne-Marie at a pre-wedding reception

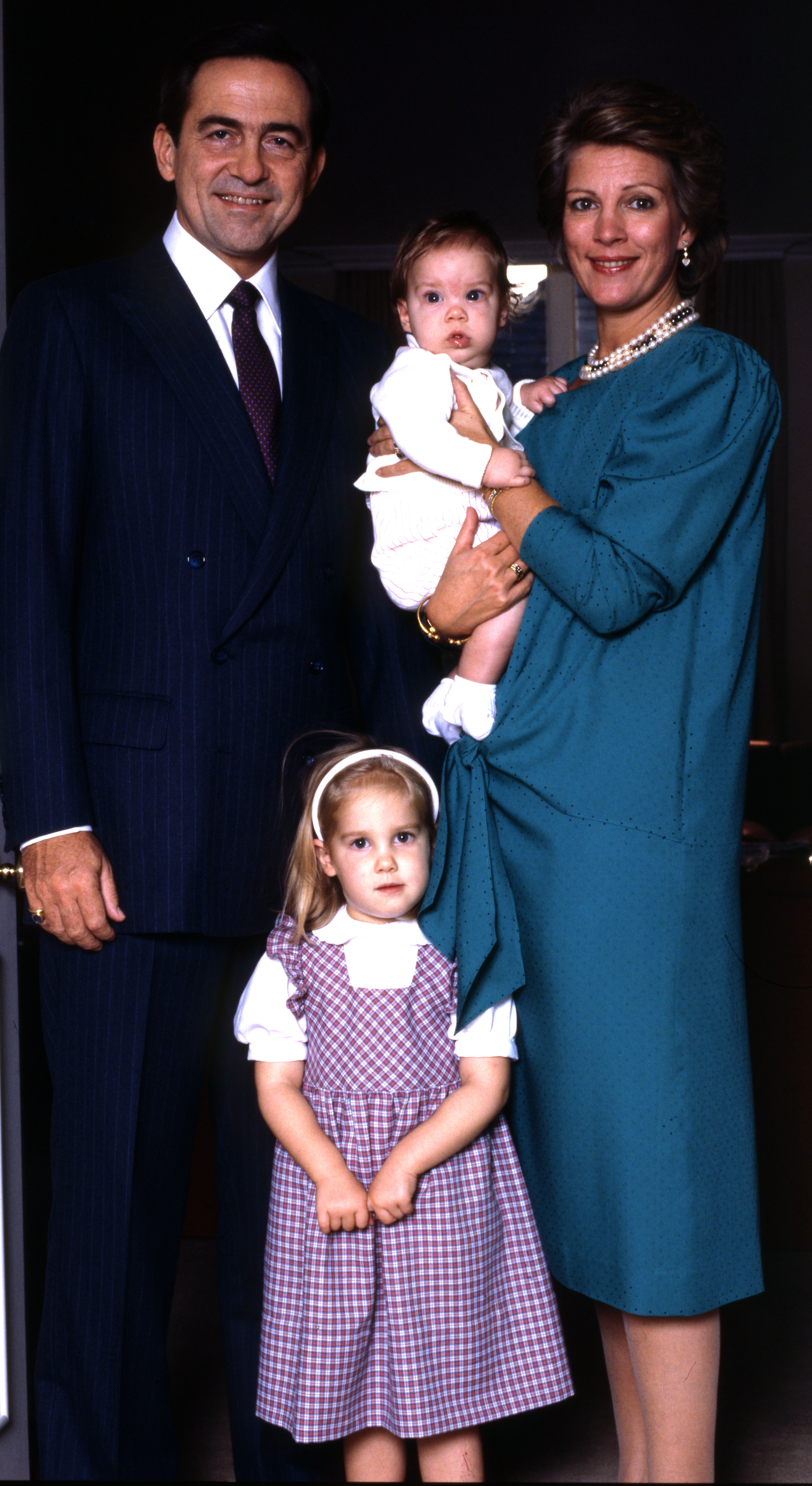
Constantine and Anne-Marie with their youngest children, Theodora and Philippos, by Allan Warren, 1987

Constantine and Anne-Marie had five children:

Name	Birth	Marriage		Children
Name	Birth	Date	Spouse	Children
Princess Alexia	10 July 1965 (age 61)	9 July 1999	Carlos Morales Quintana	Arrietta Morales y de Grecia; Anna-Maria Morales y de Grecia; Carlos Morales y de Grecia; Amelia Morales y de Grecia
Crown Prince Pavlos	20 May 1967 (age 59)	1 July 1995	Marie-Chantal Miller	Princess Maria-Olympia; Prince Constantine-Alexios; Prince Achileas-Andreas; Prince Odysseas-Kimon; Prince Aristidis-Stavros
Prince Nikolaos	1 October 1969 (age 57)	25 August 2010; Divorced 2024	Tatiana Blatnik	
Prince Nikolaos	1 October 1969 (age 57)	7 February 2025	Chrysí Vardinogianni	
Princess Theodora	9 June 1983 (age 43)	28 September 2024	Matthew Kumar	
Prince Philippos	26 April 1986 (age 40)	12 December 2020 / 23 October 2021	Nina Flohr	Prince Kimon

Queen Anne-Marie of Greece House of Glücksburg Born: 30 August 1946
Greek royalty
Vacant Title last held by Frederica of Hanover	Queen consort of the Hellenes; 18 September 1964 – 1 June 1973	Succeeded by Role abolished
