= Princess Theodora of Greece and Denmark (born 1983) =

British-Greek actress

Princess Theodora
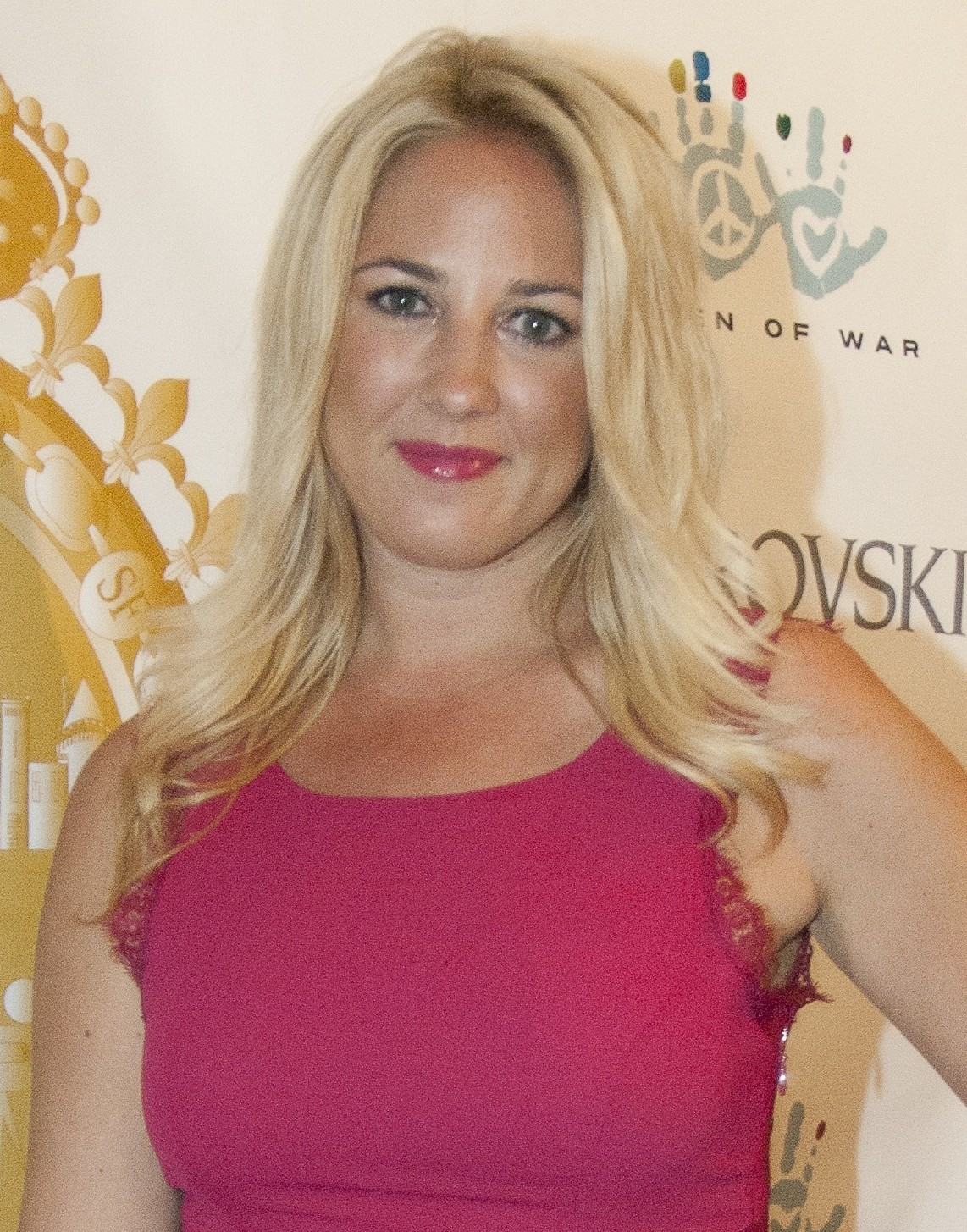
- Theodora in 2012
- Born: 9 June 1983 (age 43); St Mary's Hospital, London, England
- Spouse: Matthew Kumar (m. 2024)
- House: Glücksburg
- Father: Constantine II of Greece
- Mother: Anne-Marie of Denmark
- Occupation: Actress
- Education: Brown University (BA); Central Saint Martins

Princess Theodora of Greece and Denmark (Greek: Θεοδώρα Ντε Γκρες, romanized: Theodora de Grèce; born 9 June 1983), also known under her stage name Theodora Greece, is a British-Greek actress and member of the Greek and Danish royal families. She is the fourth child and younger daughter of deposed King Constantine II of Greece and Queen Anne-Marie of Greece. Theodora made her television debut in 2011 as Alison Montgomery in the American soap opera The Bold and the Beautiful. She has also acted in films, including minor roles in the 2009 romantic comedy The Lightkeepers and in the 2015 war-drama Little Boy.

== Biography ==
=== Early life ===
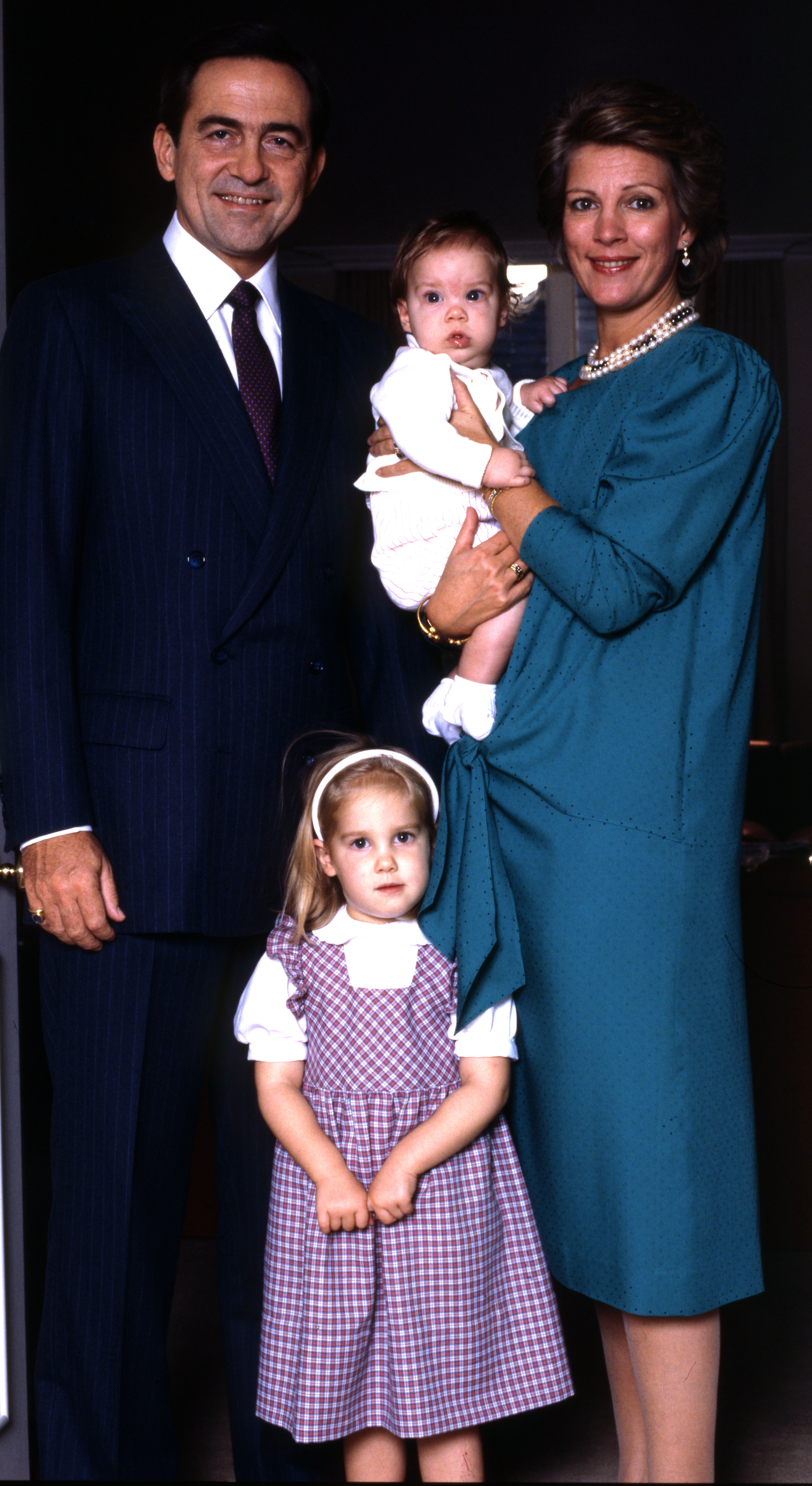
Theodora with her parents and younger brother

Theodora was born on 9 June 1983 at St Mary's Hospital, London. She is the younger daughter and fourth of the five children of the deposed Greek king Constantine II and his wife, Anne-Marie of Denmark.

On 20 October 1983, she was christened in a Greek Orthodox ceremony at the Saint Sophia Cathedral, London.

=== Education ===
Theodora attended Woldingham School, an all-girls boarding school in Surrey, England, between 1994 and 2001. After a gap year spent at St Philip's College in Alice Springs, Australia, Theodora attended Brown University where she received her Bachelor of Arts on 28 May 2006 in Theatre Arts, having also attended Northeastern University in Boston. Subsequently, she undertook graduate studies at Central Saint Martins College of Art and Design.

=== Career ===
In April 2010, Theodora moved to Los Angeles to pursue an acting career, appearing in supporting roles under the stage name Theodora Greece. She previously had minor roles in the Danish film The Wild Swans and in the American romantic comedy film The Lightkeepers in 2009. She made her television debut as the secretary Alison Montgomery in the long-running American soap opera television show The Bold and the Beautiful, on 5 December 2011. She went on to act in films including Little Boy, June and The Great Awakening.

=== Personal life ===
On 16 November 2018, it was announced that Princess Theodora was engaged to American attorney Matthew Jeremiah Kumar. The wedding was due to take place in Spetses in May 2020, but was postponed due to the coronavirus pandemic. The wedding was postponed a second time, in 2023, following the death of her father.

On 28 September 2024, Theodora married Kumar in a Greek Orthodox ceremony officiated by Metropolitan Dorotheos II of Syros at the Metropolitan Cathedral of Athens. Guests included 250 friends and relatives, including members of European royal families, such as the bride's aunt, Queen Sofia of Spain, and Infanta Cristina of Spain, Infanta Elena of Spain, Princess Alexandra of Sayn-Wittgenstein-Berleburg, Count Michael Ahlefeldt-Laurvig-Bille, Princess Benedikte of Denmark, Crown Prince Alexander of Yugoslavia, Crown Princess Katherine of Serbia, and Prince Christian of Hanover. Two of her brothers, Crown Prince Pavlos and Prince Philippos, and her nephew Prince Achileas-Andreas, served as groomsmen. Her nieces, Princess Maria-Olympia and Arrietta Morales y de Grecia, served as bridesmaids. For the ceremony, Theodora wore a custom gown by Celia Kritharioti, an Irish lace veil that once belonged to her great-grandmother Princess Margaret of Connaught, and a Cartier diamond tiara that was given to Princess Margaret of Connaught by Abbas II of Egypt. The veil and tiara have been worn by all of Queen Ingrid of Denmark's female descendants.

Οn 20 December 2024, Theodora, along with the other members of the former royal family acquired Greek citizenship, under the name Theodora de Grèce. The family was deprived of citizenship in 1994 when the former King Constantine refused to acquire a surname, as required by law for all Greek citizens.

== Filmography ==
Year	Title	Role	Notes
2009	De vilde svaner (The Wild Swans)	Elisa	film, voice role
2009	The Lightkeepers	Impressed Lady	film
2010	Sroloc	Sarah Park	TV series, 1 episode
2011	Nevan Saunders' Quest for Fame: A Documentary by Kip Griffen	Jen	film
2011–2018, 2026–present	The Bold and the Beautiful	Alison Montgomery	TV series, Recurring role
2012	Amnesia	Rachel	film
2013	Shang	Brooke Sangreen	TV movie
2015	Little Boy	Eliza	film
2015	June	Ms. Wapos	film
2016	Killer Assistant	Lara Berkis	TV movie
2016	Blind Follow	Cricket II	short film
2017	Broken Slinky Presents	Theodora	TV series, 2 episodes
2017	Gates of Hades		TV movie
2017	Respect Greece		TV movie
2018	Static	Daphney	short film
2022	The Great Awakening	Savannah	film

== Ancestry ==
Her paternal grandparents were King Paul of Greece and Frederica of Hanover. Her maternal grandparents are Frederik IX of Denmark and Ingrid of Sweden. As an agnatic descendant of Christian IX of Denmark Theodora is a Danish princess, and because King Christian's second son, Prince William of Denmark, was elected "George I, King of the Hellenes" in 1863, her father (George's great-grandson) inherited the throne of Greece in 1964. Her parents, King Constantine II and Queen Anne-Marie of Greece, were third cousins and of the Danish Royal Family. Through her father, she is also a second cousin, once removed of King William III.

Ancestors of Princess Theodora of Greece and Denmark (born 1983)

16. George I of Greece
8. Constantine I of Greece
17. Grand Duchess Olga Constantinovna of Russia
4. Paul of Greece
18. Frederick III, German Emperor
9. Princess Sophia of Prussia
19. Victoria, Princess Royal
2. Constantine II of Greece
20. Ernest Augustus, Crown Prince of Hanover
10. Ernest Augustus, Duke of Brunswick
21. Princess Thyra of Denmark
5. Princess Frederica of Hanover
22. Wilhelm II, German Emperor
11. Princess Victoria Louise of Prussia
23. Princess Augusta Victoria of Schleswig-Holstein
1. Princess Theodora of Greece and Denmark
24. Frederik VIII of Denmark
12. Christian X of Denmark
25. Princess Louise of Sweden
6. Frederik IX of Denmark
26. Frederick Francis III, Grand Duke of Mecklenburg-Schwerin
13. Duchess Alexandrine of Mecklenburg-Schwerin
27. Grand Duchess Anastasia Mikhailovna of Russia
3. Princess Anne-Marie of Denmark
28. Gustaf V of Sweden
14. Gustaf VI Adolf of Sweden
29. Princess Victoria of Baden
7. Princess Ingrid of Sweden
30. Prince Arthur, Duke of Connaught and Strathearn
15. Princess Margaret of Connaught
31. Princess Louise Margaret of Prussia
