= Prince Nikolaos of Greece and Denmark =

Greek prince (born 1969)

Prince Nikolaos
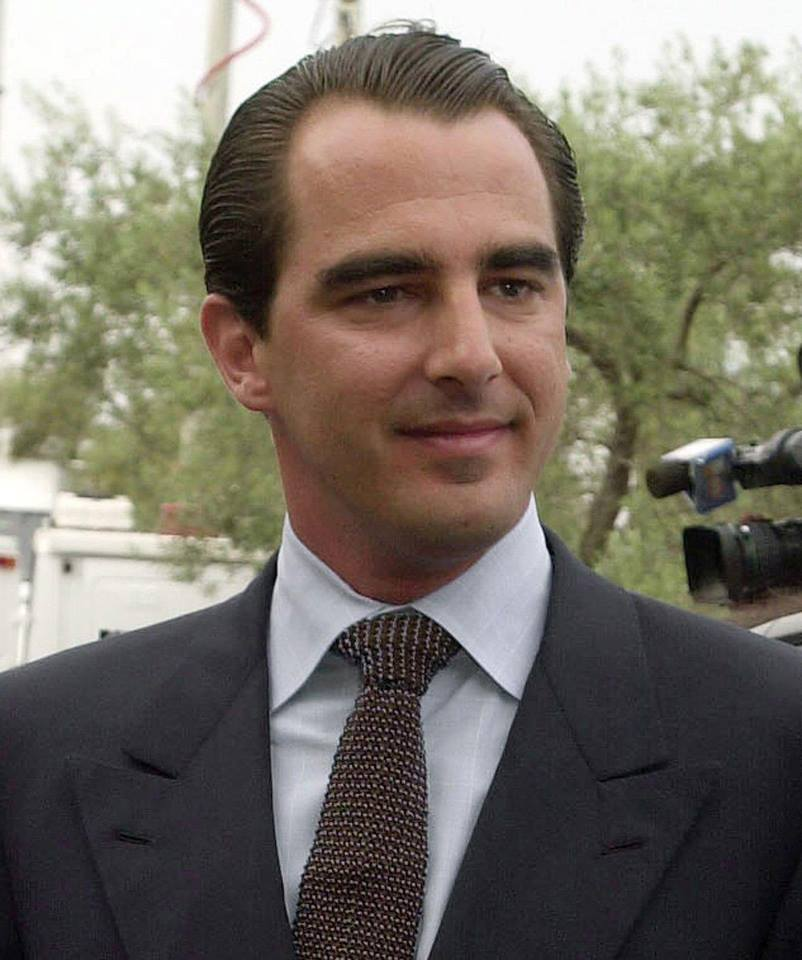
- Born: 1 October 1969 (age 57); Clinica Nuova Villa Claudia, Rome, Italy
- Spouses: Tatiana Blatnik (m. 2010; div. 2024); Chrysí Vardinogianni (m. 2025)
- House: Glücksburg
- Father: Constantine II of Greece
- Mother: Anne-Marie of Denmark

Prince Nikolaos of Greece and Denmark (Greek: Νικόλαος Ντε Γκρες, romanized: Nikólaos de Grèce; born 1 October 1969) is the third child of Constantine II and Anne-Marie, who were the last King and Queen of Greece, from 1964 to 1973.

== Early life and education ==
Nikolaos was born at Casa di Cura Privata Nuova Villa Claudia in Rome, Italy, on 1 October 1969. He is the first royal child to be born in hospital from Constantine II of Greece and Anne-Marie of Denmark. His family had been living in exile since December 1967. His father was deposed in 1973 and the monarchy abolished on 8 December 1974.

He was baptized in the Greek Orthodox Church. His godparents were Queen Sofía, Queen of Spain (his paternal aunt), Princess Irene of Greece and Denmark (another paternal aunt), Margareta of Romania (his paternal second cousin), and Crown Prince Alexander of Yugoslavia (another paternal second cousin).

Like his brothers and sisters, he was educated in the Hellenic College of London, founded by his parents in 1980. He attended Brown University in Rhode Island, graduating with an A.B. in International Relations. He has worked for Fox Television Network in New York, NatWest Markets in London and is currently working in his father's private office since 1998. He is a member of board of the Anna-Maria Foundation, designed to help victims of natural disasters like floods and earthquakes in Greece.

Nikolaos has an older sister Princess Alexia, an older brother Crown Prince Pavlos, a younger sister Princess Theodora, and a younger brother, Prince Philippos.

== Personal life ==
=== Relationships ===
The engagement of Nikolaos to Tatiana Ellinka Blatnik, with whom he had been in a long-term relationship, was announced on 28 December 2009 by the office of King Constantine in London. Until July 2010, when she resigned to concentrate on her wedding plans, Blatnik had worked as an event planner in the publicity department for fashion designer Diane von Fürstenberg.

On 25 August 2010, the couple married at the Orthodox Church of St. Nicholas in Spetses, Greece. On 19 April 2024, the couple announced that they had decided to dissolve their marriage.

In January 2025, Nikolaos became engaged to Chrysí Vardinogiánni, daughter of Greek businessman Giórgos Vardinogiánnis and Agapi Politi. Chrysí was previously married to singer Stéfanos Xypolitás, better known as Nino, with whom she shares two children – Giórgo Skévo Xypolitás (born 2013) and Káren Agápi Xypolitá (born 2014). After they divorced in 2017, she dated actor Konstantínos Markoulákis for five years, before splitting in December 2023.

The Greek Orthodox wedding was held on 7 February 2025 at the Holy Church of Saint Nicholas Ragavas in Plaka, Athens in a ceremony conducted by Amphilochios, Metropolitan Bishop of Kissamos and Selino. Guests included members of the Greek, Danish and Spanish royal families.

=== Citizenship ===
Οn 20 December 2024, Nikolaos along with other members of the former royal family acquired Greek citizenship, under the surname de Grèce.

== Titles, styles, honours and arms ==
=== Titles ===
Styles of Prince Nikolaos
- Reference style: His Royal Highness
- Spoken style: Your Royal Highness

- 1 October 1969 – present: His Royal Highness Prince Nikolaos of Greece and Denmark

=== Honours ===
==== Dynastic orders ====
- (Greece) Greek royal family:
  - Grand Cross of the Royal Order of the Redeemer
  - Grand Cross of the Royal Family Order of Saints George and Constantine
  - Officer of the Royal Order of George I
  - Officer of Royal Order of the Phoenix

==== Foreign honours ====
- Denmark: Recipient of the Silver Jubilee Medal of Queen Margrethe II
- Serbia: Order of Karađorđe Star

== Ancestry ==
Ancestors of Prince Nikolaos of Greece and Denmark

8. Constantine I of Greece
4. Paul of Greece
9. Princess Sophia of Prussia
2. Constantine II of Greece
10. Ernest Augustus, Duke of Brunswick
5. Princess Frederica of Hanover
11. Princess Victoria Louise of Prussia
1. Prince Nikolaos of Greece and Denmark
12. Christian X of Denmark
6. Frederik IX of Denmark
13. Duchess Alexandrine of Mecklenburg-Schwerin
3. Princess Anne-Marie of Denmark
14. Gustaf VI Adolf of Sweden
7. Princess Ingrid of Sweden
15. Princess Margaret of Connaught
