= Hellenic College of London =

Former bilingual school in London

Coordinates: 51.4965°N 0.1629°W

Information
- Established: 1980
- Closed: 2005
- Enrollment: 80 (2005)
- Language: Greek; English

Hellenic College of London was a bilingual school in Knightsbridge, London. It was founded in 1980 by former King Constantine II and Queen Anne-Marie of Greece, and closed in 2005.

== History ==
It started as a boarding school, but it later also functioned as a day school. The second headmaster was Lydia Anderson, followed by James Wardrobe. The school was for Greek pupils or pupils with Greek origins. By 1996, it had 280 pupils, but after that it declined, finally having only 80 in 2005. Hellenic College's governors included Constantine, Anne-Marie, their son Nikolaos (an alumnus), and Michael Chandris.

== Alumni ==
- Princess Alexia of Greece and Denmark
- Pavlos, Crown Prince of Greece
- Prince Nikolaos of Greece and Denmark
- Prince Philippos of Greece and Denmark
