= Katherine Karađorđević =

Crown Princess of Yugoslavia (born 1943)

- Crown Princess of Yugoslavia
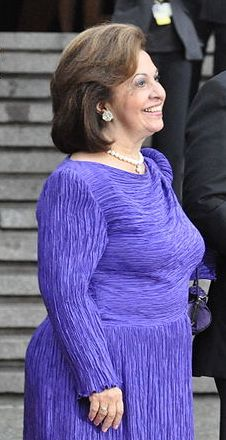
- Katherine at the wedding gala of Crown Princess Victoria of Sweden in 2010.
- Born: Katherine Batis; 13 November 1943 (age 82); Athens, Kingdom of Greece
- Spouse: Jack Walter Andrews (m. 1962; div. 1984) Alexander, Crown Prince of Yugoslavia (m. 1985)
- Issue: David Andrews; Alison Andrews
- House: Karađorđević (by marriage)
- Father: Robert Batis
- Mother: Anna Dosti

Katherine Karađorđević, Crown Princess of Yugoslavia (Note: The title Crown Princess of Yugoslavia derives from her marriage to Alexander, Crown Prince of Yugoslavia, who is commonly referred to by courtesy as Crown Prince of Yugoslavia, the historical title he held until the Yugoslav monarchy was abolished by the communist regime in 1945.) (Serbian: Катарина Карађорђевић; née Batis, Greek: Μπατής; born 13 November 1943) is a humanitarian and the wife of Alexander, Crown Prince of Yugoslavia, a claimant to the defunct Yugoslav throne and an advocate of constitutional monarchy in Serbia.

She is also referred to as Crown Princess of Serbia by the former Yugoslav royal family and by supporters for a Serbian monarchy. (Note: The style Crown Princess of Serbia is a modern style used by the former royal family and supporters of a monarchy in Serbia. The Kingdom of Serbia was dissolved and ceased to exist in 1918 when it became part of the Kingdom of Serbs, Croats and Slovenes under the rule of the Karađorđević dynasty, later renamed the Kingdom of Yugoslavia. The Karađorđević dynasty continued as the reigning royal house of the Yugoslav state, and Alexander's father, Peter II, was the last King of Yugoslavia.)

== Biography ==
Katherine Batis was born on 13 November 1943 in Athens, one of the two daughters of Robert Batis (1916–2011), a factory owner, director, and president, later honorary president, of Fostiras Football Club, and his wife, Anna Dosti.

Katherine undertook her primary and secondary education in Athens and Lausanne, Switzerland. Later, she studied business at the University of Denver in Colorado and the University of Dallas, Texas.

On 25 November 1962, she married Jack Walter Andrews (1933–2013), and divorced in 1984. They have two children, David and Alison. David has one son: Alexander. Alison has four children: Amanda, Stephanie, Nicolas, and Michael.

Katherine met her second husband, Crown Prince Alexander, in Washington, DC, in 1984, and they were married in London, civilly on 20 September 1985 and religiously the next day at the Saint Sava Cathedral in Notting Hill, London. Their best man was former king Constantine II of Greece, and the witness was Prince Tomislav of Yugoslavia, Crown Prince Alexander's uncle.

On 17 July 2001, after the democratic revolution in Serbia, she and her husband took up residence in the Royal Palace in Belgrade.

Katherine has been involved in charitable activities worldwide all of her life. The conflicts in the former Yugoslavia created widespread humanitarian needs, and Princess Katherine responded by establishing organizations to provide assistance to those affected. She is the founder and patron of various humanitarian organizations including Lifeline Humanitarian Organization in 1993. In 2001 she established The HRH Crown Princess Katherine Foundation in Belgrade.

In 2024, Katherine underwent surgery and treatment for pancreatic cancer at the University of Pittsburgh Medical Center in the United States. Serbian public broadcaster RTS reported that the operation was performed urgently. She continues her public and humanitarian activities following treatment. https://royalfamily.org/crown-princess-katherine-home-in-belgrade-after-triumph-over-cancer/

== Humanitarian work ==
Katherine’s humanitarian work encompasses relief efforts and extensive philanthropic activity internationally and throughout the former Yugoslavia. Her international humanitarian work includes participation in archival and conservation projects involving the Monastery of Saint Catherine in Sinai, Egypt. In 1998, she became a trustee of the Saint Catherine Foundation in the United Kingdom, participating in efforts involving manuscript conservation, library preservation and restoration projects. She also served as president of the American Associates of the Saint Catherine Foundation. In addition to her archival work, she participated in international relief projects through World in Harmony, including bringing dairy cows to impoverished families in India and supporting clean-water well construction in Myanmar (then Burma).

She founded Lifeline Humanitarian Organization in 1993 and subsequently established Lifeline offices in New York, Toronto, London and Athens. She founded the Foundation of HRH Crown Princess Katherine in Belgrade in September 2001 and founded the Serbian Diaspora Medical Conference in 2009 bring doctors from Serbia and the Serbian diaspora together with international medical experts to exchange professional knowledge and develop cooperation.

Her humanitarian work through these organizations and initiatives has addressed healthcare, social welfare and humanitarian needs, including assistance to children, families facing hardship, refugees, displaced persons and elderly people. Her work has included the procurement and delivery of medical equipment to hospitals and clinics; donation of incubators, neonatal-care equipment and ambulances; support for neonatal units, maternity wards, intensive-care wards, oncology centres and emergency departments; reconstruction and renovation of medical facilities; support for children without parental care and children with disabilities; social-welfare programmes; medical collaborations with Serbian and international doctors; the establishment of the Children’s SOS Line; and large-scale public-health initiatives such as cancer-screening campaigns and mobile mammography screening for women.

She provided incubators and neonatal-care equipment to hospitals, including hospitals that previously had no incubators. In 2024, she delivered incubators, patient monitors and infusion pumps for neonatal departments at two general hospitals in Serbia.

She also supported emergency medical services, including the donation of ambulances and essential medical equipment to hospitals and health centres. The Foundation reported that its humanitarian projects included ambulances and other equipment needed by the healthcare system.

She supported maternity services, including the establishment and equipping of a delivery room. In 2023, the Princess Katherine Foundation worked with the Stavros Niarchos Foundation on the reconstruction and outfitting of a new delivery room at the Narodni Front Clinic in Belgrade.

In 2005, Princess Katherine established the Children’s SOS Line in Serbia in cooperation with the Ministry of Labour, Employment and Social Policy, the Ministry of Health, the Ministry of Education and Sport, the People’s Office of the President of Serbia and other institutions. The free, anonymous and confidential service provided children with access to advice and assistance concerning problems they faced. The Serbian government reported that the line began operating in October 2005.

Princess Katherine received donations of two digital mobile mammography units, making breast-cancer examinations more accessible to women. By 2021, more than 145,000 women had been examined through the programme.

Radio Television of Serbia reported that more than 250 projects had been implemented during the first twenty years of the Foundation’s operation. It also reported that the Foundation and its founder, Princess Katherine, had provided assistance valued at at least €20 million.

In 2022, the Royal Medical Board reported that humanitarian assistance associated with the Foundation included the procurement of medical equipment, reconstruction and renovation of healthcare facilities, and assistance with the training of Serbian doctors abroad. The Board also reported that 16 Serbian Diaspora Medical Conferences had been organized, with more than 800 lecturers and approximately 10,000 participants.

Lifeline currently reports more than 350 publicly documented projects and initiatives, with the documented value of equipment, renovations and reconstruction exceeding €25 million. It also reports that more than 165,000 women have been examined through its mobile mammography programme.

Her humanitarian work also included raising funds for the replacement of doors at the Temple of Saint Sava in Belgrade.

Katherine has described her humanitarian work as a lifelong mission focused on helping people in need, including through healthcare, social protection and medical cooperation.

== Honours and awards ==
=== Dynastic honours ===
- (Kingdom of Yugoslavia) House of Karađorđević: Grand Cross of the Order of Karadjordje’s Star

=== Awards ===
- Honorary degree of Doctor of Letters (D.Litt.) from the University of Sheffield in the United Kingdom
- Serbian Orthodox Church: Member of the Decoration of Emperor Constantine the Great.
