= Princess Tatiana of Greece and Denmark =

Entrepreneur, author, philanthropist (born 1980)

Princess Tatiana
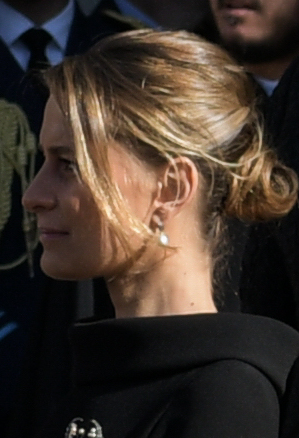
- Tatiana in 2023
- Born: Tatiana Ellinka Blatnik; 27 August 1980 (age 45); Caracas, Venezuela
- Spouse: Prince Nikolaos of Greece and Denmark (m. 2010; div. 2024)
- Father: Ladislav Vladimir Blatnik
- Mother: Marie Blanche Bierlein
- Occupation: Entrepreneur, author, philanthropist

Princess Tatiana of Greece and Denmark (born Tatiana Ellinka Blatnik, 27 August 1980) is a Venezuelan entrepreneur, author and philanthropist. She was a member of the non-reigning Greek royal family and the extended Danish royal family as the wife of Prince Nikolaos, son of Constantine II. She and Prince Nikolaos divorced in 2024. Following her divorce, she was permitted to retain her titles. She worked as a publicist and event planner for Diane von Fürstenberg and, in 2016, published the cookbook A Taste of Greece.

== Early life and ancestry ==
Tatiana Blatnik was born in Caracas, Venezuela, and was raised in Switzerland. She is the daughter of Ladislav Vladimir Blatnik and Marie Blanche Bierlein. Through her mother, she is a direct descendant of William II, Elector of Hesse. Her maternal grandparents are Ernst Bierlein and Countess Ellinka Karin Harriet von Einsiedel. Princess Tatiana's father was born in the Kingdom of Yugoslavia in 1931 and later moved to Venezuela. He at one time was engaged to the Hollywood actress Natalie Wood. Her father died when she was seven and she was raised by her mother. Her former stepfather, Attilio Brillembourg, is the owner of a New York area financial services company.

Tatiana studied at Aiglon College, then at Georgetown University graduating in 2003 with a degree in sociology. Until July 2010, when she resigned to concentrate on her wedding plans, Tatiana had worked in the publicity department as an event planner for fashion designer Diane von Fürstenberg.

== Engagement and marriage ==
Prince Nikólaos's engagement to Tatiana Blatnik, with whom he had been in a long-term relationship, was announced on 28 December 2009, by the office of King Constantine in London. Blatnik and Prince Nikólaos were married in the Orthodox Church of St. Nicholas, Spetses, Greece, on 25 August 2010. The bride wore a gown designed by Venezuelan Ángel Sánchez.

The couple announced their amicable separation on 19 April 2024. She retained her royal titles following the divorce. In February 2025, she announced that she would continue to live in Greece.

== Notable published works ==
- A Taste of Greece: Recipes, Cuisine & Culture - with Diana Farr Louis – (2016).

== Honours ==
=== Dynastic orders ===
- (Greece) Greek Royal Family:
  - 25 August 2010: Dame Grand Cross of the Order of Saints Olga and Sophia
