= Prince Philippos of Greece and Denmark =

Member of the former Greek royal family (born 1986)

Prince Philippos
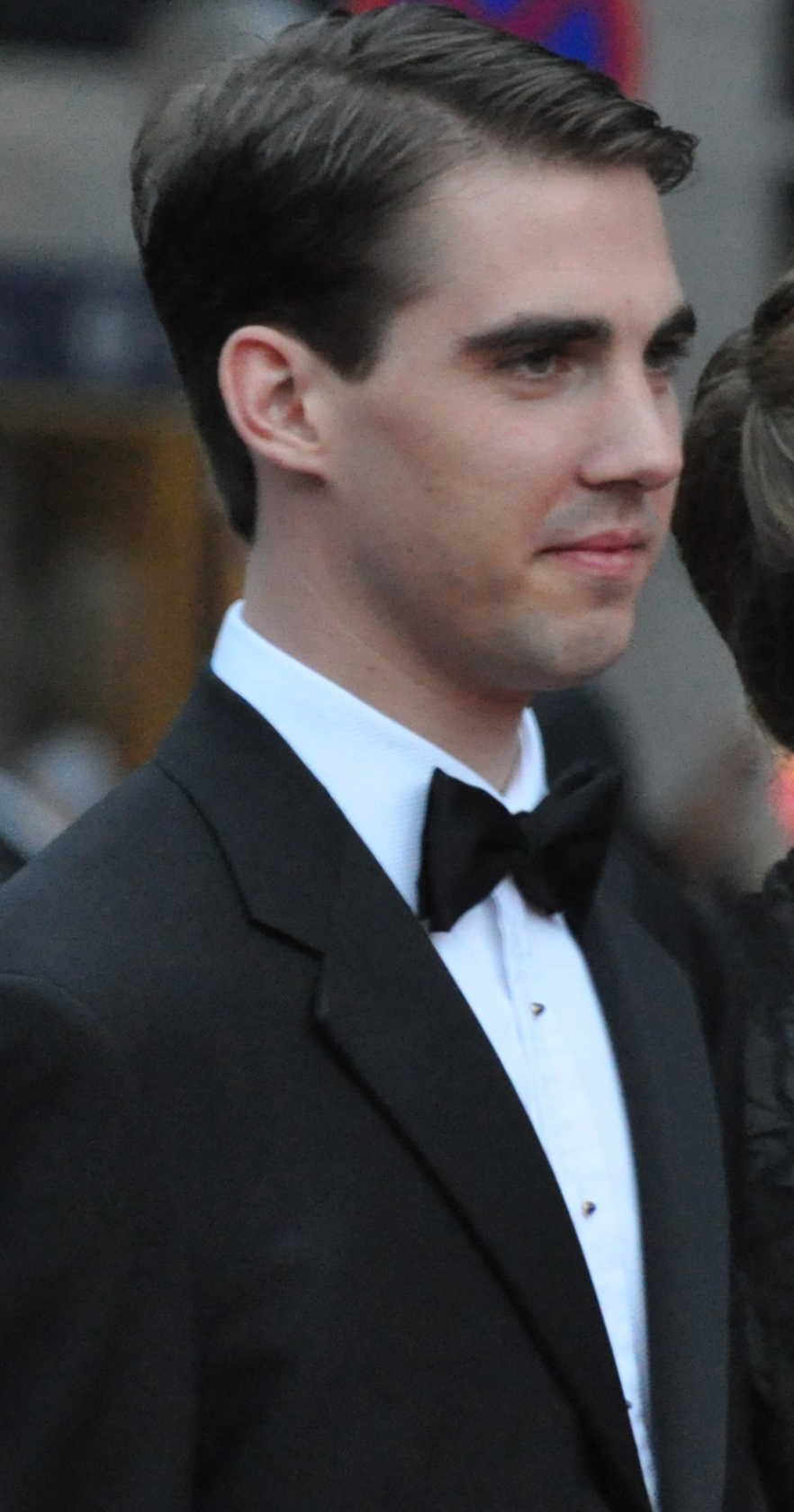
- Philippos in 2010
- Born: 26 April 1986 (age 40); St Mary's Hospital, London, England
- Spouse: Nina Flohr (m. 2020)
- Issue: Prince Kimon
- House: Glücksburg
- Father: Constantine II of Greece
- Mother: Anne-Marie of Denmark

Prince Philippos of Greece and Denmark (Greek: Φίλιππος Ντε Γκρες, romanized: Phílippos de Grèce; born 26 April 1986) is the youngest child of Constantine II and Anne-Marie, who were the last King and Queen of Greece, from 1964 to 1973.

== Early life and education ==
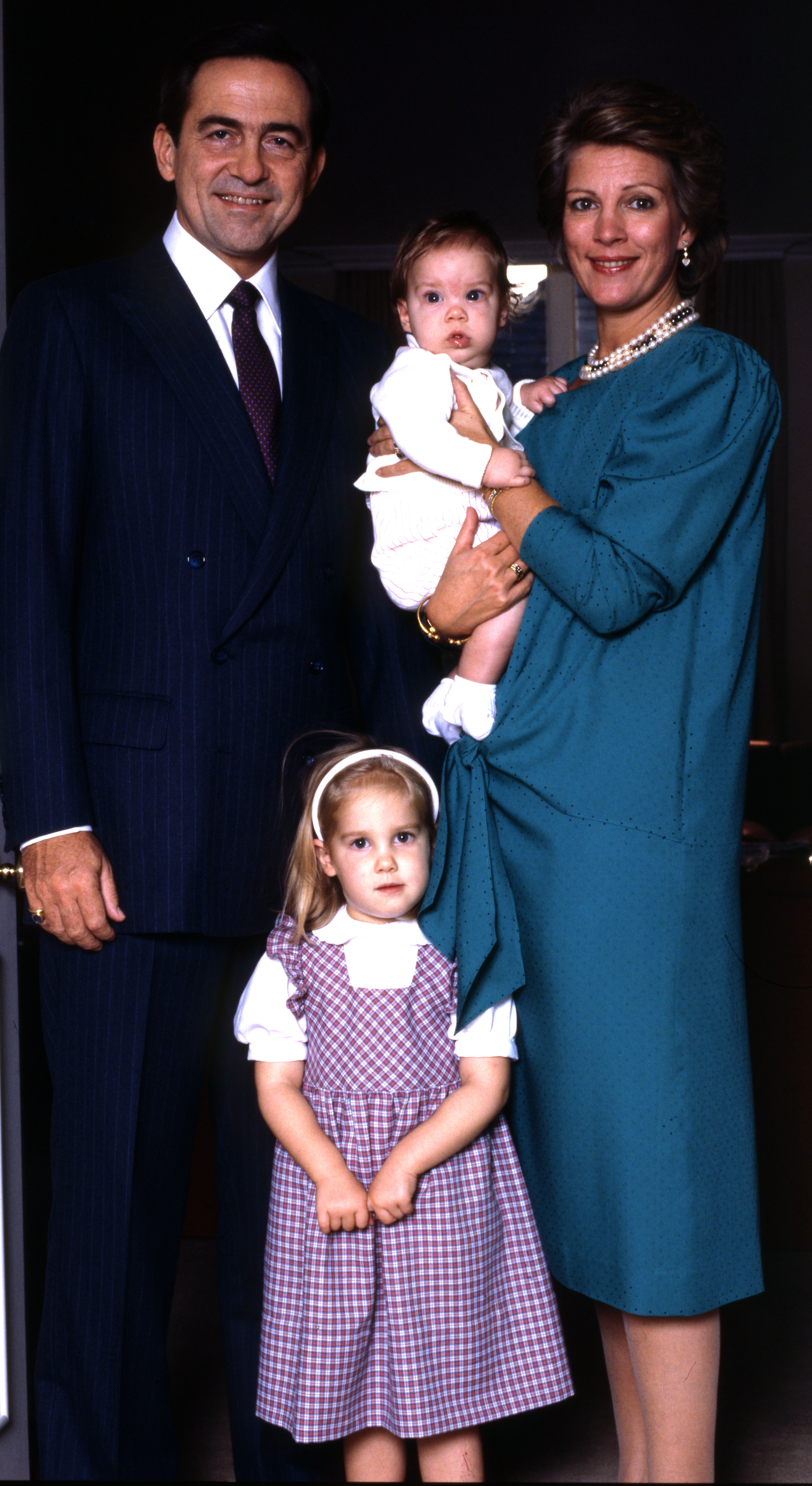
Prince Philippos as an infant with his parents and sister, Princess Theodora.

Philippos was born at St Mary's Hospital, London, on 26 April 1986, the third son of King Constantine II and Queen Anne-Marie of Greece. His family had been living in exile since December 1967. His father was deposed in 1973 and the monarchy abolished on 8 December 1974.

He was baptized in the Greek Orthodox Church at Saint Sophia Cathedral, London, on 10 July 1986, with King Juan Carlos I of Spain, Prince Philip, Duke of Edinburgh, Diana, Princess of Wales, Infanta Elena of Spain, Princess Benedikte of Denmark, Kyril, Prince of Preslav and Penelope, Lady Romsey serving as godparents.

He attended the Hellenic School at London and the United World Colleges in the US. Later on he studied at Georgetown University, graduating in 2008 with his bachelor's degree in foreign relations. After graduating, he interned in the public relations department of the United Nations. As of 2018, he lives in New York City and works as an analyst for Ortelius Capital. Alongside his four siblings, he is a Director of the Anne-Marie Foundation.

== Personal life ==
In 2018, Philippos began dating Nina Nastassja Flohr, the daughter of Swiss businessman Thomas Flohr, who founded the private jet rental company VistaJet, and Katharina Flohr (née Konečný), former Creative Director of Fabergé and editor-in-chief of the Russian Vogue. That same year, they appeared together in public at the wedding of Princess Eugenie of York and Jack Brooksbank. They made other appearances as a couple, including the wedding of Lord Edward Spencer-Churchill and Kimberly Hammerstroem in 2018 and the wedding of Jean-Christophe, Prince Napoléon and Countess Olympia von und zu Arco-Zinneberg in 2019.

In 2020 while vacationing in Ithaca, Greece, Flohr and Prince Philippos became engaged. The engagement was announced by the former Greek royal family's press office on 1 September 2020. They were married civilly on 12 December 2020 in a private ceremony in St. Moritz, Switzerland. Due to the COVID-19 pandemic in Switzerland, the only guests at the wedding were the couple's parents. A Greek Orthodox ceremony took place on 23 October 2021, at Metropolitan Cathedral of Athens. At this ceremony, Nina wore a wedding dress tailored by Chanel and the diamond Corsage Tiara, which was worn by her sister-in-law, Marie Chantal, at her wedding. In attendance were Philippos and Nina's parents, siblings, nephews and nieces, as well as extended members of the Greek royal family, such as Queen Sofía of Spain, Prince Michael, Princess Marina and Princess Tatiana Radziwill. Other attendees included Princess Benedikte of Denmark, the Hereditary Prince and Hereditary Princess of Hanover, Prince and Princess Christian of Hanover, the Prince of Preslav, Princess Beatrice of York, Edoardo Mapelli Mozzi, Princess Eugenie of York, Jack Brooksbank and Sabine Getty, along with her daughter, Gene, who acted as a flower girl. A reception was held at the National Gymnastics Association and another one at the Piraeus Yacht Club, hosted by Constantine. They have a son, Prince Kimon Thomas Konstantinos of Greece and Denmark, who was born via a surrogate on 27 July 2026 in the United States.

On 28 September 2024, Philippos served as a groomsman at the wedding of Princess Theodora of Greece and Denmark and Matthew Kumar at the Metropolitan Cathedral of Athens.

Οn 20 December 2024, Philippos along with the other members of the former royal family acquired Greek citizenship, under the surname De Grece. The family was deprived of citizenship in 1994 when the former King Constantine refused to acquire a surname, as required by law for all Greek citizens.

== Titles, styles and honours ==
Styles of Prince Philippos
- Reference style: His Royal Highness
- Spoken style: Your Royal Highness

=== Titles and styles ===
Following the deposition of the Greek monarchy in 1973, the title "Prince of Greece" with the style of Royal Highness is no longer legally recognised by the government of the Hellenic Republic. Through his male-line descent from Christian IX of Denmark, he is also a Danish prince with the style of Highness.

=== Dynastic orders ===
- (Greece) Greek royal family:
  - Grand Cross of the Order of the Redeemer
  - Grand Cross of the Order of the Order of Saints George and Constantine
  - Grand Cross of the Order of George I
  - Grand Cross of the Order of the Phoenix

== Ancestry ==
Ancestors of Prince Philippos of Greece and Denmark

8. Constantine I of Greece
4. Paul of Greece
9. Princess Sophia of Prussia
2. Constantine II of Greece
10. Ernest Augustus, Duke of Brunswick
5. Princess Frederica of Hanover
11. Princess Victoria Louise of Prussia
1. Prince Philippos of Greece and Denmark
12. Christian X of Denmark
6. Frederik IX of Denmark
13. Duchess Alexandrine of Mecklenburg-Schwerin
3. Princess Anne-Marie of Denmark
14. Gustaf VI Adolf of Sweden
7. Princess Ingrid of Sweden
15. Princess Margaret of Connaught
