= Konieczny =

Konieczny (masculine), Konieczna (feminine) is a Polish surname. A possible origin is a nickname for a person who lived at the edge of a village, from the archaic meaning of the word konieczny, 'last'.

Early records of the surname are dated by 1408 (Petro dicto Koneczni) or 1526 (Kon(i)eczny). As of 2026, there were over 26,000 persons with this surname in Poland.

Variants: Koneczny, Skoneczny, Skonieczny. Abroad it can take the form Konietzny. Czech-language counterpart: Konečný.

Notable people with the surname include:

== Konieczny ==
- Aleksy Konieczny (1925–?), Polish bobsledder
- Bartłomiej Konieczny (born 1981), Polish footballer
- Doug Konieczny (born 1951), American baseball player
- Edward J. Konieczny (born 1954), American bishop from Oklahoma
- Hans-Peter Konieczny, one of the members of the Red Army Faction
- Jerzy Konieczny (1950–2020), Polish politician
- Marian Konieczny (1930–2017), Polish sculptor
- Robert Konieczny (born 1969), Polish architect
- Tomasz Konieczny (born 1972), Polish opera singer
- Zdzisław Konieczny (1930–2016), Polish historian
- Zygmunt Konieczny (born 1937), Polish composer
- Zygmunt Konieczny (bobsleigh) (1927–2003), Polish bobsledder

== Konieczna ==
- Aleksandra Konieczna (born 1965), Polish actress
- Aneta Konieczna (born 1978), Polish sprint canoer
- Karolina Konieczna, Polish road cyclist
- Klaudia Konieczna (born 1995), Polish volleyball player
