= Flohr =

Flohr is a surname. Notable people with the surname include:

- Bruce Flohr, founder of RailTex
- Marlon Flohr, Dutch EDM producer, half of Bassjackers
- Nina Flohr, Swiss businesswoman
- Salo Flohr, Czech-Jewish chess grandmaster
- Thomas Flohr, Swiss billionaire, founder of VistaJet

== See also ==
- Paul R. Mendes-Flohr
- Op Flohr Stadion
