= Thomas Flohr =

Swiss businessman (born 1960)

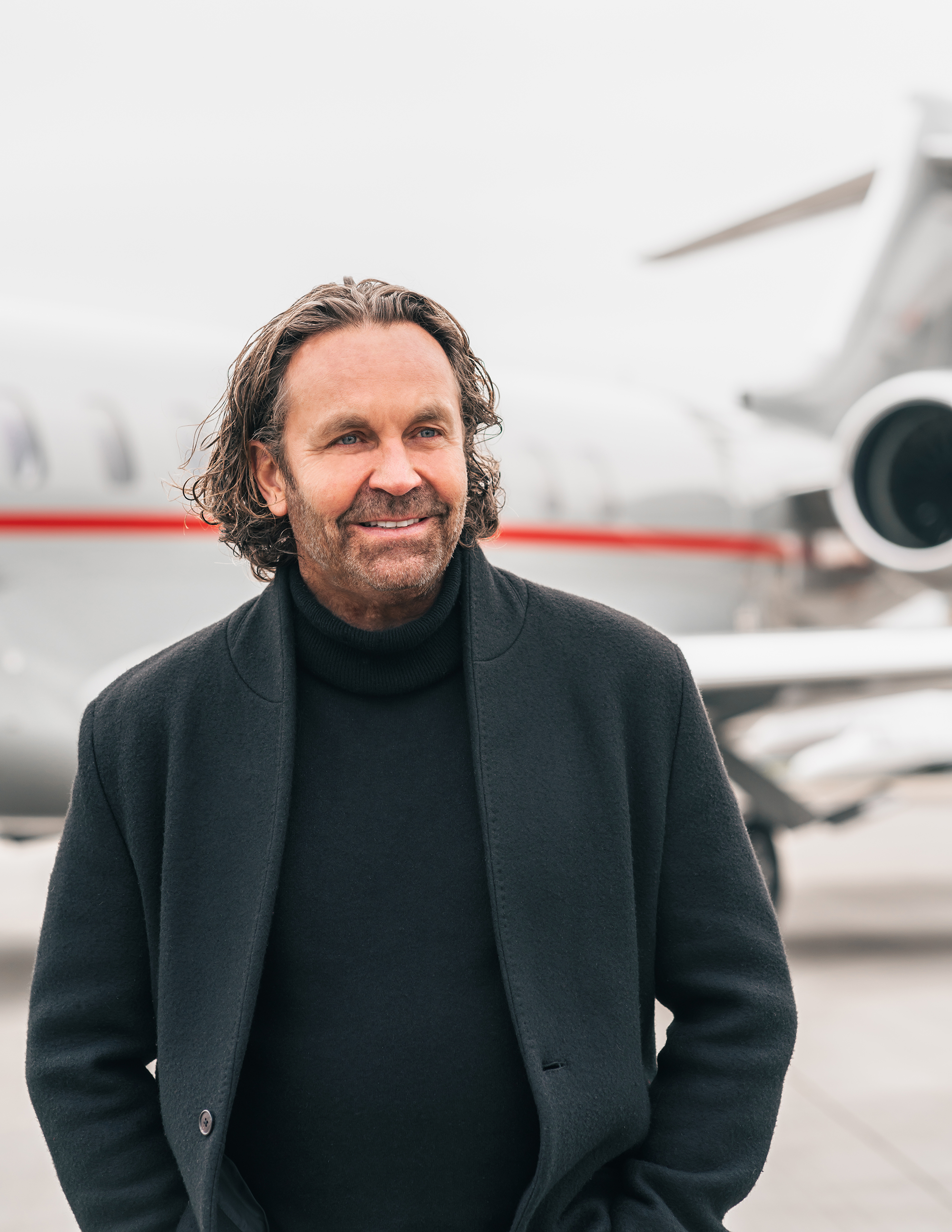
- Flohr in 2019
- Born: 17 March 1960 (age 66); Switzerland
- Education: LMU Munich
- Occupation: Businessman
- Known for: Founder and owner of VistaJet
- Spouse: Katharina Konečný (divorced)
- Children: Princess Nina of Greece and Denmark
- Categorisation: FIA Bronze

Signature
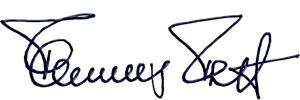

Thomas Flohr (born 17 March 1960) is a Swiss billionaire businessman and amateur racing driver. He is the founder and chairman of VistaJet, a private jet charter company.

As of March 2018, Forbes estimated his net worth to be US$2.3 billion.

== Early life ==
Flohr was born in Switzerland on 17 March 1960, the son of a teacher. He was raised in Erlenbach, Germany. After school he applied unsuccessfully for flight training at Lufthansa. He studied business and political science at LMU Munich.

== Career ==
From 1985 until the early 2000s, Flohr worked for the US technology firm Comdisco. He was President of their European division from 1990 to 1994. He was President of Comdisco's worldwide asset finance division from 1995 to 2000. He would later buy out most of Comdisco's European operations through his Swiss-based group Comprendium Investment, which he still controls.

In 2003, Flohr bought his first Learjet 60.

In 2004, Flohr founded VistaJet and began operations in 2005. In 2016, Flohr was named Entrepreneur of the Year by The Living Legends of Aviation awards. VistaJet officially reached unicorn status in 2017, with a $150 million investment from Rhône Capital, valuing the company’s equity at over $2.5 billion.

In 2020, the U.S. government announced its intentions to seize property belonging to Flohr. The mansion was the subject of scrutiny after its previous owner was implicated in a corruption scandal.

In 2024, Flohr alleged in legal filings that a rival company had launched a smear campaign against Vista. Flohr claims that AirX founder John Matthews used a burner email address with a fabricated identity to send emails to business contacts of VistaJet, bypassing court-ordered confidentiality.

Flohr also alleges that Matthews created a WhatsApp group in March 2023, titled VistaComms, which was used to discuss with colleagues the use of burner emails to share confidential information about VistaJet. In March 2025, the UK High Court judged in favor of Flohr in a fraud claim brought against him by Frontiers Capital and Timothy Horlick, a British financier.

In April 2025, private equity firm RRJ led a $600M investment in Vista. In addition, Vista began a $700M debt raise, which will save them around $160M in debt payments in 2025. As of 2025, VistaJet operates a fleet of around 270 aircraft, including 18 Bombardier Global 7500s. Its North American business now accounts for ~50% of activity. Other markets include the UK, India, and Africa. VistaJet's subscription-based model is currently bringing in around $3 billion annually.

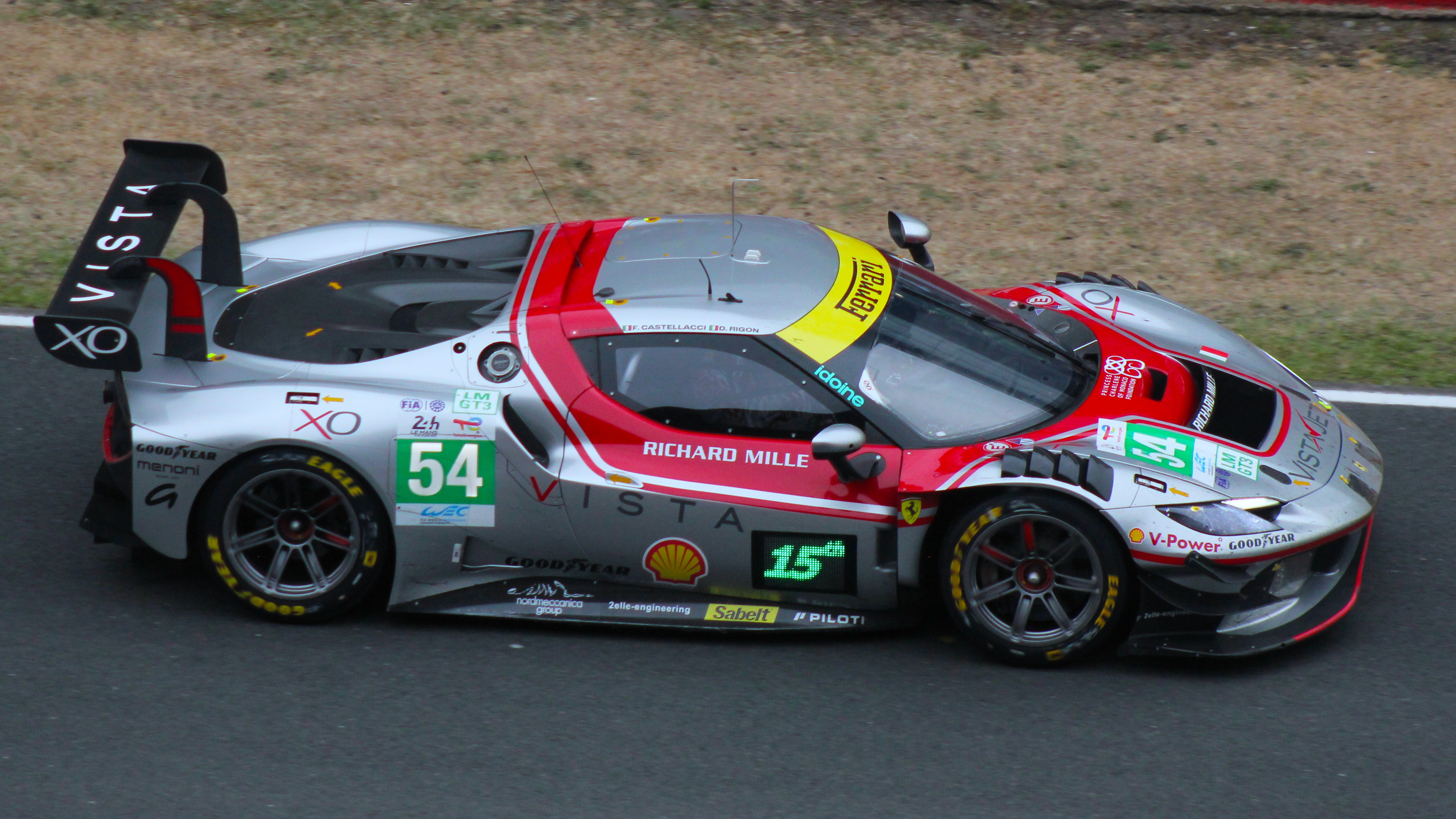
Flohr's No. 54 car at the 2025 24 Hours of Le Mans

Flohr lives in St. Moritz, Switzerland. Flohr competes in motorsport, starting with the East African Safari Rally, Le Mans 24 Hour and currently in the FIA World Endurance Championship; he is also a sponsor to the Scuderia Ferrari team. He collects art, including Jeff Koons, Keith Haring and Sterling Ruby.

== Personal life ==
Flohr was married to Katharina Flohr (née Konečný), formerly creative director of Fabergé and editor of Vogue Russia. Together they had one daughter, Nina, who was the former brand director of VistaJet. On 1 September 2020, the former Greek royal family announced the engagement of Nina Flohr with Prince Philippos of Greece and Denmark, fifth child and third son of King Constantine II and Queen Anne-Marie of Greece. The couple married in a civil ceremony in St. Moritz on 12 December 2020, with Thomas as one of only two guests in attendance.

== Racing record ==
=== Career summary ===
Season	Series	Team	Races	Wins	Poles	F/Laps	Podiums	Points	Position
2013	Winter Series by GT Sport - GTS	Kessel Racing	4	0	0	0	1	?	?
2013	Spanish GT Championship - GTS	Kessel Racing	3	0	0	0	0	0	NC
2013	International GT Open - GTS	Kessel Racing	4	0	0	0	0	0	NC
2014	European Le Mans Series - GTC	AF Corse	2	0	0	0	0	14	16th
2014	International GT Open - GTS	AF Corse	5	0	0	0	0	3	32nd
2014	Gulf 12 Hours - GT3	AF Corse	1	0	0	0	0	N/A	7th
2015	European Le Mans Series - GTC	AF Corse	4	1	0	0	2	56	4th
2015	International GT Open - Pro-Am	AF Corse	1	0	1	0	1	3	11th
2016	GT3 Le Mans Cup	AF Corse	6	0	0	0	0	34	7th
2016	International GT Open - Pro-Am	AF Corse	2	0	0	0	0	6	23rd
2016	Gulf 12 Hours - Pro-Am	AF Corse	1	1	1	0	1	N/A	1st
2017	FIA World Endurance Championship - LMGTE Am	Spirit of Race	9	1	0	0	4	109	4th
2017	24 Hours of Le Mans - LMGTE Am	Spirit of Race	1	0	0	0	0	N/A	12th
2018	European Le Mans Series - GTE	Spirit of Race	1	0	0	0	0	8	14th
2018	24 Hours of Le Mans - LMGTE Am	Spirit of Race	1	0	0	0	1	N/A	2nd
2018–19	FIA World Endurance Championship - LMGTE Am	Spirit of Race	8	0	0	0	2	99	4th
2019	24 Hours of Le Mans - LMGTE Am	Spirit of Race	1	0	0	0	0	N/A	12th
2019–20	FIA World Endurance Championship - LMGTE Am	AF Corse	7	0	0	0	0	71	12th
2020	European Le Mans Series - GTE	AF Corse	1	0	0	0	0	0	NC
2020	24 Hours of Le Mans - LMGTE Am	AF Corse	1	0	0	0	0	N/A	13th
2021	Asian Le Mans Series - GT	AF Corse	4	0	0	0	0	1.5	16th
2021	FIA World Endurance Championship - LMGTE Am	AF Corse	6	0	0	0	1	71	6th
2021	24 Hours of Le Mans - LMGTE Am	AF Corse	1	0	0	0	0	N/A	11th
2022	FIA World Endurance Championship - LMGTE Am	AF Corse	6	0	0	0	0	58	8th
2022	24 Hours of Le Mans - LMGTE Am	AF Corse	1	0	0	0	0	N/A	6th
2023	FIA World Endurance Championship - LMGTE Am	AF Corse	7	1	0	0	1	91	3rd
2023	24 Hours of Le Mans - LMGTE Am	AF Corse	1	0	0	0	0	N/A	5th
2024	FIA World Endurance Championship - LMGT3	Vista AF Corse	8	1			1	57	7th
2025	FIA World Endurance Championship - LMGT3	Vista AF Corse	3	0	0	0	1	31	5th*
2025–26	Asian Le Mans Series - GT	Vista AF Corse							
2026	FIA World Endurance Championship - LMGT3	Vista AF Corse							

^{*} Season still in progress.
† - As Flohr is a guest driver, he was ineligible to score points.

=== Complete FIA World Endurance Championship results ===
Year	Entrant	Class	Car	Engine	1	2	3	4	5	6	7	8	9	Rank	Points
2017	Spirit of Race	LMGTE Am	Ferrari 488 GTE	Ferrari F154CB 3.9 L Turbo V8	SIL; Ret	SPA; 4	LMS; 7	NÜR; 2	MEX; 4	COA; 3	FUJ; 1	SHA; Ret	BHR; 3	4th	109
2018–19	Spirit of Race	LMGTE Am	Ferrari 488 GTE	Ferrari F154CB 3.9 L Turbo V8	SPA; 8	LMS; 2	SIL; 9	FUJ; 6	SHA; 4	SEB; 2	SPA; 4	LMS; 7		4th	99
2019–20	AF Corse	LMGTE Am	Ferrari 488 GTE Evo	Ferrari F154CB 3.9 L Turbo V8	SIL; 9	FUJ; 6	SHA; 8	BHR; 5	COA; 7	SPA; 7	LMS; 4			12nd	71
2021	AF Corse	LMGTE Am	Ferrari 488 GTE Evo	Ferrari F154CB 3.9 L Turbo V8	SPA; 4	ALG; 3	MNZ; 7	LMS; 7	BHR; 7	BHR; 6				6th	71
2022	AF Corse	LMGTE Am	Ferrari 488 GTE Evo	Ferrari F154CB 3.9 L Turbo V8	SEB; 9	SPA; 4	LMS; 5	MNZ; 9	FUJ; 4	BHR; 7				8th	58
2023	AF Corse	LMGTE Am	Ferrari 488 GTE Evo	Ferrari F154CB 3.9 L Turbo V8	SEB; 5	PRT; 4	SPA; NC	LMS; 5	MNZ; 10	FUJ; 1	BHR; 4			3rd	91
2024	Vista AF Corse	LMGT3	Ferrari 296 GT3	Ferrari F163 3.0 L Turbo V6	QAT; 5	IMO; 12	SPA; 6	LMS; Ret	SÃO; 15	COA; Ret	FUJ; 1	BHR; 7		7th	57
2025	Vista AF Corse	LMGT3	Ferrari 296 GT3	Ferrari F163 3.0 L Turbo V6	QAT; 8	IMO; 5	SPA; 3	LMS; Ret	SÃO; 11	COA; 3	FUJ; 6	BHR; Ret		7th	54
2026	Vista AF Corse	LMGT3	Ferrari 296 GT3 Evo	Ferrari F163CE 3.0 L Turbo V6	IMO; 11	SPA; 15	LMS; Ret	SÃO; 17	COA; 10	FUJ; 4	CAT; 12	MNZ; Ret		22nd	13

^{*} Season still in progress.

=== Complete 24 Hours of Le Mans results ===
Year	Team	Co-Drivers	Car	Class	Laps	Pos.	Class Pos.
2017	(Switzerland) Spirit of Race	(Italy) Francesco Castellacci (Monaco) Olivier Beretta	Ferrari 488 GTE	GTE; Am	326	41st	12th
2018	(Switzerland) Spirit of Race	(Italy) Francesco Castellacci (Italy) Giancarlo Fisichella	Ferrari 488 GTE	GTE; Am	335	26th	2nd
2019	(Switzerland) Spirit of Race	(Italy) Francesco Castellacci (Italy) Giancarlo Fisichella	Ferrari 488 GTE	GTE; Am	327	43rd	12th
2020	(Italy) AF Corse	(Italy) Francesco Castellacci (Italy) Giancarlo Fisichella	Ferrari 488 GTE Evo	GTE; Am	330	39th	13th
2021	(Italy) AF Corse	(Italy) Francesco Castellacci (Italy) Giancarlo Fisichella	Ferrari 488 GTE Evo	GTE; Am	329	39th	11th
2022	(Italy) AF Corse	(New Zealand) Nick Cassidy (Italy) Francesco Castellacci	Ferrari 488 GTE Evo	GTE; Am	340	39th	6th
2023	(Italy) AF Corse	(Italy) Francesco Castellacci (Italy) Davide Rigon	Ferrari 488 GTE Evo	GTE; Am	312	31st	5th
2024	(Italy) Vista AF Corse	(Italy) Francesco Castellacci (Italy) Davide Rigon	Ferrari 296 GT3	LMGT3	30	DNF	DNF
2025	(Italy) Vista AF Corse	(Italy) Francesco Castellacci (Italy) Davide Rigon	Ferrari 296 GT3	LMGT3	192	DNF	DNF
2026	(Italy) Vista AF Corse	(Italy) Francesco Castellacci (Italy) Davide Rigon	Ferrari 296 GT3 Evo	LMGT3	110	DNF	DNF
