= 2023 24 Hours of Le Mans =

91st 24 Hours of Le Mans endurance race

| Previous: 2022 | Next: 2024 |
Index: Races | Winners

(France) 2023 24 Hours of Le Mans
Event information
- Round 4 of 7 in the 2023 FIA World Endurance Championship
- Date: 10–11 June 2023
- Location: Le Mans, France
- Venue: Circuit de la Sarthe
- Duration: 24 Hours

Results
- Laps completed: 342
- Distance (km): 4660.092
- Distance (miles): 2895.714
- Hypercar

Pole position
- Time: 3:22.982
- Team: (Italy) Ferrari AF Corse
- Drivers: (Italy) Antonio Fuoco

Winners
- Team: (Italy) Ferrari AF Corse
- Drivers: (United Kingdom) James Calado (Italy) Antonio Giovinazzi (Italy) Alessandro Pier Guidi
- LMP2

Winners
- Team: (Poland) Inter Europol Competition
- Drivers: (Spain) Albert Costa (Switzerland) Fabio Scherer (Poland) Jakub Śmiechowski
- LMP2 Pro-Am

Winners
- Team: (Portugal) Algarve Pro Racing
- Drivers: (Australia) James Allen (United States) Colin Braun (United States) George Kurtz
- LMGTE AM

Winners
- Team: (United States) Corvette Racing
- Drivers: (Netherlands) Nicky Catsburg (United States) Ben Keating (Argentina) Nicolás Varrone

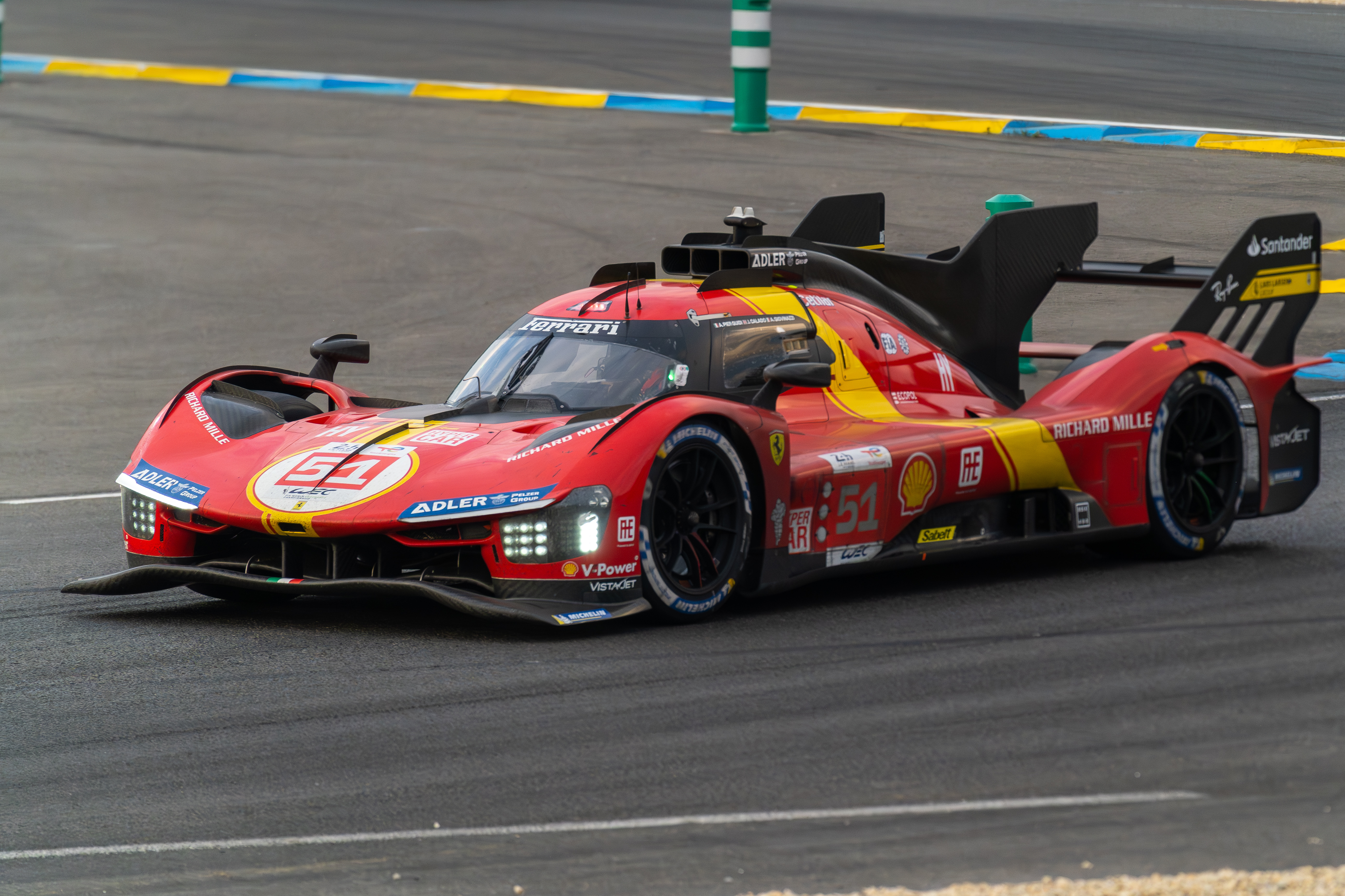
The race-winning No. 51 Ferrari 499P

The 91st 24 Hours of Le Mans (French: 91^{e} 24 Heures du Mans), also known as the Centenary 24 Hours of Le Mans (French: Centenaire des 24 Heures du Mans), was an automobile endurance race for teams of three drivers racing Le Mans Hypercars (LMH), Le Mans Prototype (LMP) and Le Mans Grand Touring Endurance (LMGTE) cars held from 10 to 11 June 2023 at the Circuit de la Sarthe, near Le Mans, France. Held in front of 325,000 spectators, it was the 91st running of the Automobile Club de l'Ouest's 24-hour race—100 years after the first—and marked the fourth round of the 2023 FIA World Endurance Championship (WEC). There was a test day on 4 June, a week before the event.

A Ferrari 499P shared by Antonio Fuoco, Miguel Molina and Nicklas Nielsen of Ferrari AF Corse started from pole position after Fuoco set the overall fastest lap in the Le Mans Hypercar class in the Hyperpole session. Their teammates James Calado, Antonio Giovinazzi and Alessandro Pier Guidi in the second AF Corse Ferrari won overall after leading the final 55 laps. It was the first overall Le Mans victory for Calado, Giovinazzi and Pier Guidi, as well as Ferrari's tenth and its first since 1965. Sébastien Buemi, Brendon Hartley and Ryō Hirakawa finished second in a Toyota GR010 Hybrid after battling the eventual winners in the second half of the race. Third overall was taken by Cadillac Racing's Cadillac V-Series.R LMDh car, driven by Earl Bamber, Alex Lynn and Richard Westbrook.

Albert Costa, Fabio Scherer and Jakub Śmiechowski of Inter Europol Competition led the last 112 laps of the Le Mans Prototype 2 (LMP2) class in an Oreca 07-Gibson car to claim their maiden WEC class victory. Team WRT's Rui Andrade, Louis Delétraz and Robert Kubica finished second by 21.015 seconds, while René Binder, Neel Jani and Nico Pino of Duqueine Team took third. Corvette Racing's Nicky Catsburg, Ben Keating and Nicolás Varrone in a Chevrolet Corvette C8.R came from two laps down, after a second-hour pit stop to replace a failed damper, to win the final Le Mans Grand Touring Endurance Am (LMGTE Am) and GTE race, one lap ahead of ORT by TF's Aston Martin Vantage AMR shared by Ahmad Al Harthy, Michael Dinan and Charlie Eastwood.

Calado, Giovinazzi and Pier Guidi's victory moved them from fifth to second in the Hypercar Drivers' Championship, 25 points behind leaders Buemi, Hartley and Hirakawa. Andrande, Delétraz and Kubica remained the leaders in the competition for the FIA Endurance Trophy for LMP2 Drivers; category winners Costa, Scherer and Śmiechowski moved from sixth to second. Catsburg, Keating and Varrone extended their Endurance Trophy for LMGTE Am Teams lead over Al Harthy, Dinan and Eastwood. Toyota, the No. 41 Team WRT and No. 33 Corvette Racing teams left Le Mans as the respective Hypercar World Endurance Championship, Endurance Trophy for LMP2 Teams and Endurance Trophy for LMGTE Am Teams leaders with three races left in the season.

== Background ==
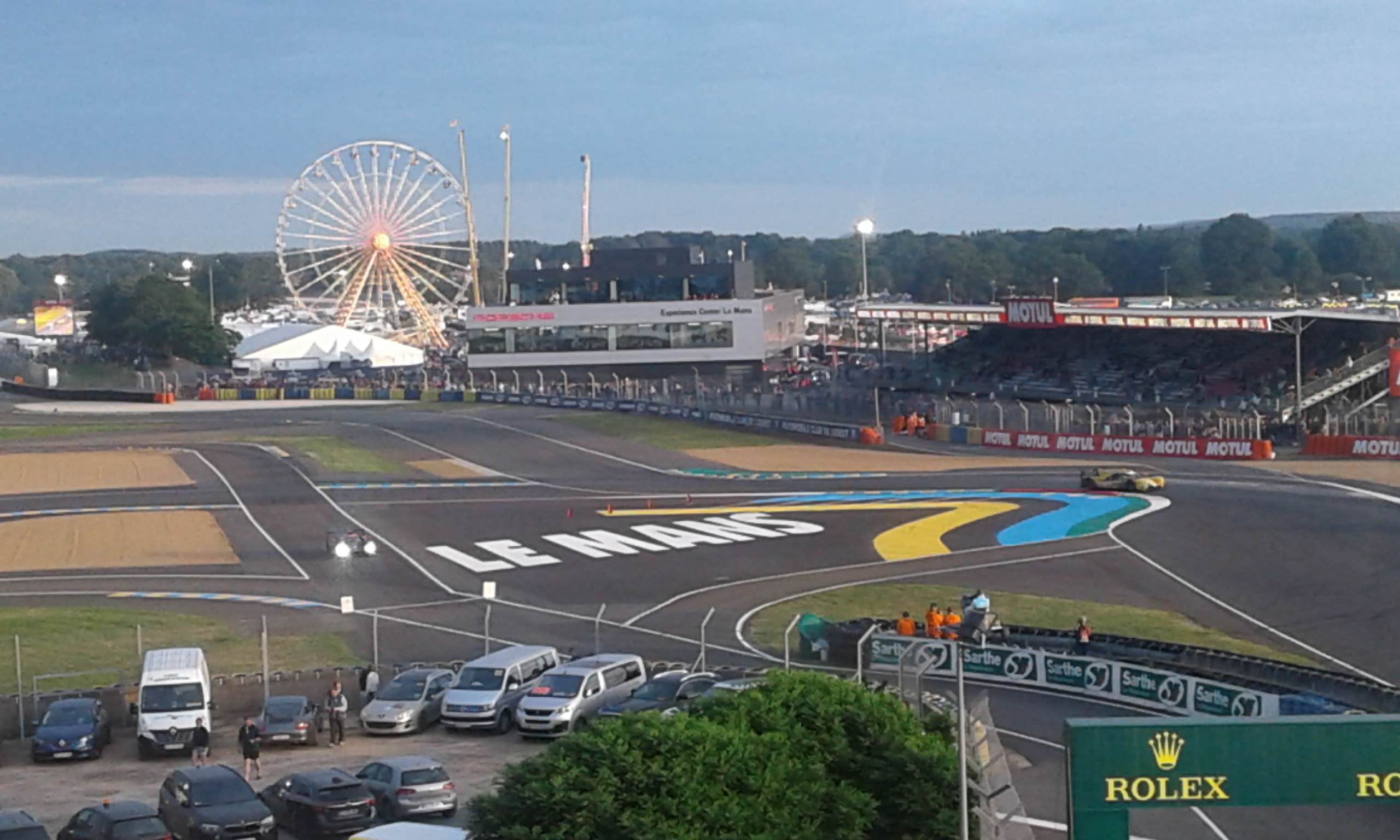
The Circuit de la Sarthe, where the race was held

The 2023 24 Hours of Le Mans, held at the Circuit de la Sarthe near Le Mans, France between 10 and 11 June, was the 91st running of the race, the 100th anniversary of its first edition in 1923 and the fourth round of the 2023 FIA World Endurance Championship.

Before the event, Toyota drivers Sébastien Buemi, Brendon Hartley and Ryō Hirakawa led the Hypercar Drivers' Championship with 71 points, five ahead of their teammates Mike Conway, Kamui Kobayashi and José María López. Ferrari AF Corse's Antonio Fuoco, Miguel Molina and Nicklas Nielsen were third, with Cadillac Racing's Earl Bamber, Alex Lynn and Richard Westbrook fourth.

In the FIA Endurance Trophy for LMP2 Drivers, Phil Hanson and Frederick Lubin of United Autosports led Team WRT's Rui Andrade, Louis Delétraz and Robert Kubica by an eight-point advantage while Corvette Racing's Nicky Catsburg, Ben Keating and Nicolás Varrone led the Endurance Trophy for LMGTE Am Teams from Richard Mille AF Corse's Luis Pérez Companc, Alessio Rovera and Lilou Wadoux by 39 points.

Toyota led Ferrari by 33 points in the Hypercar World Endurance Championship, while the No. 22 United Autosports squad led the No. 41 Team WRT team in the Endurance Trophy for LMP2 Teams by eight points and the No. 33 Corvette Racing team led the No. 83 Richard Mille AF Corse squad in the Endurance Trophy for LMGTE Am Teams with an 39-point advantage.

== Regulation changes ==
Following a lengthy analysis of the safety car's use by the race organiser, the Automobile Club de l'Ouest (ACO), dating back to the 2018 event, in which Porsche won the Le Mans Grand Touring Endurance Professional class (LMGTE Pro) by a large margin, a new procedure was implemented, with the goal of reducing the safety car's impact on the race. Three safety cars would be deployed, but two of them would be removed, allowing every car to circulate behind the remaining safety car. This would allow any lapped vehicles to pass the sole remaining safety car and go around the circuit until they reached the end of the queue. The field would then be sorted from fastest to slowest car categories, and racing would resume. This procedure would not be used in the race's final hour. Cars could still make pit stops during safety car periods until the pit lane exit was closed by the single safety car system. The system was tested during test day a week before the race.

The Fédération Internationale de l'Automobile (FIA) and the ACO suspended a ban on tyre warmers (designed to provide additional grip to tyres at the start of a stint) to reduce the championship's environmental impact only for the race at Le Mans across all car categories. Concerns made by drivers at the preceding 6 Hours of Spa-Francorchamps race weekend, where many cars slid off the track on cold tyres and crashed in changing conditions, forced the modification. LMGTE Pro was dropped from the race in 2023, leaving only the Le Mans Grand Touring Endurance Amateur (LMGTE Am) class as the only category for GT cars.

== Entries ==
Entry to the race was open from 8 December 2022 to 21 February 2023. The ACO Selection Committee granted 62 invitations and entries were divided between the Le Mans Hypercar (Hypercar), Le Mans Prototype 2 (LMP2) and LMGTE Am categories.

=== Automatic entries ===
Teams that won championships in the European Le Mans Series (ELMS), Asian Le Mans Series (ALMS) and Michelin Le Mans Cup (MLMC) earned automatic entry invitations. Second-place finishers in the 2022 ELMS LMP2 and LMGTE championships also received an automatic invitation. All current WEC full-season entries were automatically invited. The ACO selected three IMSA SportsCar Championship (WTSC) teams as automatic enties, regardless of performance or category. Teams that earned automatic LMP2 entries were permitted to change their cars from the previous year. ELMS LMGTE and ALMS GT teams which earned automatic entries could only enter in LMGTE Am. The 2022 European and 2023 Asian LMP3 (Le Mans Prototype 3) champions had to enter a LMP2 car, while the 2022 MLMC Group GT3 (GT3) champion was restricted to LMGTE Am.

The ACO announced the full list of automatic entries on 20 February 2023. Prema Racing chose to forego their automatic invitation as winners of the 2022 ELMS LMP2 category as it wanted to field their two full-time WEC cars in the race.

Automatic entries for the 2023 24 Hours of Le Mans
| Reason invited | Hypercar | LMP2 | LMGTE Am |
|---|---|---|---|
| 1st in the European Le Mans Series (LMP2 and LMGTE) | | (Italy) Prema Racing (Note: Team declined their automatic invitation.) | (Germany) Proton Competition |
| 2nd in the European Le Mans Series (LMP2 and LMGTE) | | (France) Panis Racing | (Switzerland) Kessel Racing |
| 1st in the European Le Mans Series (LMP3) | | (Switzerland) Cool Racing | |
| 3rd in the European Le Mans Series (LMGTE) | | | (Italy) Iron Lynx |
| IMSA SportsCar Championship at-large entries | (United States) Action Express Racing | (Canada) John Farano | (United States) Ryan Hardwick |
| 1st in the Asian Le Mans Series (LMP2 and GT) | | (Luxembourg) DKR Engineering | (Germany) Walkenhorst Motorsport |
| 1st in the Asian Le Mans Series (LMP3) | | (France) Graff Racing | |
| 1st in the Michelin Le Mans Cup (GT3) | | | (Denmark) GMB Motorsport |

=== Entry list and reserves ===
The ACO announced the full 62 car entry list on the afternoon of 27 February. In addition to the 37 guaranteed WEC entries, there were 15 ELMS entries, four WTSC entries, four ALMS entries, and two one-off Le Mans entries. There were 40 cars in the two Prototype classes, 21 in the LMGTE Am class, and one innovative entry. In addition to the 62 entries invited, ten (three from LMGTE Am and seven from LMP2) were placed on a reserve list to replace withdrawn or unaccepted invitations. Reserve entries were ordered, with the first one replacing the first withdrawal from the race, regardless of class. Entries were selected for their sporting quality, technical, fan, media and public interest and commitment, loyalty to other ACO-administered series and entrant's performance.

Heart of Racing withdrew their No. 27 LMGTE Am Aston Martin Vantage AMR, which was the tenth and final entry on the reserve list, after the entry list was published. The ACO published a revised entry list on 5 May 2023. It confirmed the withdrawal of Heart of Racing's entry as well as Risi Competizione's No. 82 LMGTE Am Ferrari 488 GTE EVO, reducing the reserve list to eight entries with no other changes to the teams' list.

=== Garage 56 ===
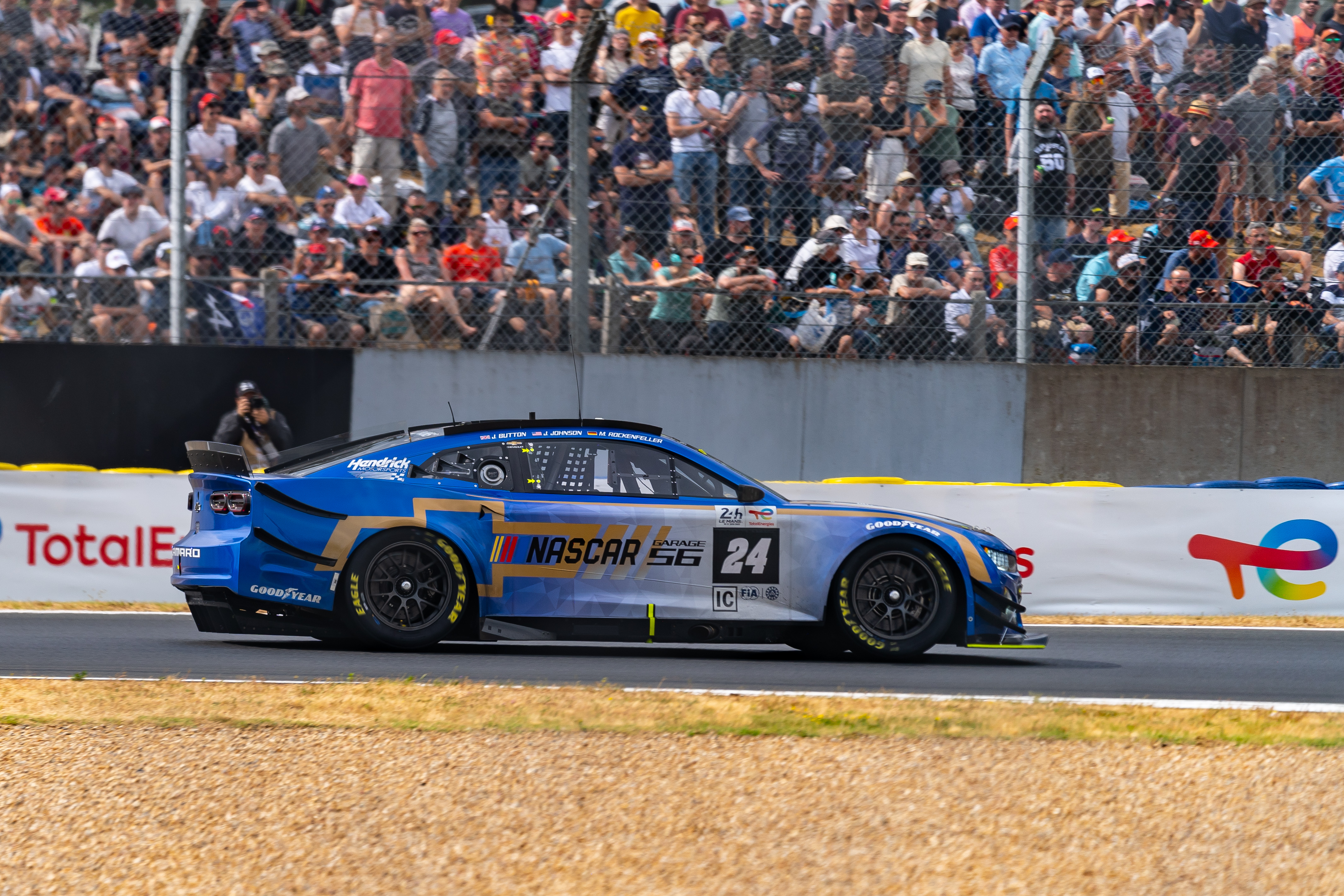
The Garage 56 Chevrolet Camaro ZL1 stock car during the race

The Garage 56 concept to test new automotive technologies at Le Mans returned after a two-year absence. It was announced at a press conference at Sebring International Raceway in March 2022 that a modified Next Gen Chevrolet Camaro ZL1 car fielded by Hendrick Motorsports would compete in the race, marking NASCAR's 75th anniversary and the first time NASCAR had a presence at Le Mans since 1976, when a Dodge Charger and Ford Torino competed in the Grand International category.

The Chevrolet Camaro ZL1 received numerous aerodynamic updates, carbon brake discs, functional front and rear headlights, and a larger 32 US gal (120 L; 27 imp gal) fuel cell, which reduced its weight by 525 lb (238 kg) compared to the NASCAR Cup Series model. Mike Rockenfeller, the 2010 overall Le Mans co-winner, joined 2009 Formula One World Champion Jenson Button and seven-time NASCAR Cup Series champion Jimmie Johnson as its drivers. Former crew chief Chad Knaus was project manager, and the car had the No. 24 in commemoration of driver Jeff Gordon.

== Pre-race balance of performance changes ==
The ACO and FIA changed the balance of performance four days before the test day to try to achieve parity in all categories since the Le Mans Hypercar performance was "greater than initially anticipated" and they did not have the manufacturers' consent prior to implement the changes. Four Hypercars received weight increases. The Toyota GR010 Hybrid, Ferrari 499P, Porsche 963 and the Cadillac V-Series.R were made 37 kg (82 lb), 24 kg (53 lb), 11 kg (24 lb) and 3 kg (6.6 lb) heavier, respectively. The Glickenhaus SCG 007 LMH, Peugeot 9X8 and Vanwall Vandervell 680-Gibson cars received no performance changes. Toyota, Ferrari, and Cadillac had their energy per stints increased to compensate for the additional ballast on their vehicles. In LMGTE Am, every car model in the Porsche 911 RSR-19, Chevrolet Corvette C8.R, Ferrari 488 GTE EVO, and Aston Martin Vantage AMR received more ballast to affect their handling. Similarly, Corvette's performance was improved by permitting a wider air intake on its engine, while Ferrari and Aston Martin's boost pressures were increased for improved performance.

== Testing ==
One week before the race, on 4 June, all entrants were obliged to participate in eight hours of driving divided into two sessions. Some drivers missed part or all of testing because they were competing in the Formula E double-header in Jakarta, the GT World Challenge Europe round at Circuit Paul Ricard or the IndyCar Series event in Detroit. Reserve drivers included Matt Campbell (Porsche Penske Motorsport; he did not participate in testing); Alexandre Cougnaud (Graff); Kazuki Nakajima (Toyota; he filled in for Buemi, who was in Jakarta); and Stoffel Vandoorne (Peugeot Sport; also in Jakarta).

The morning session was held in clear weather. Ferrari led the session with a 3:30.686 lap from Fuoco's No. 50 car, which was 0.660 seconds faster than Gustavo Menezes' No. 94 Peugeot. Yifei Ye's No. 38 Team Jota Porsche was third, ahead of James Calado's No. 51 Ferrari, Conway's No. 7 Toyota and Renger van der Zande's No. 3 Cadillac. Paul di Resta's No. 93 Peugeot halted testing at the exit of the first Mulsanne Straight chicane due to a probable electrical hybrid problem triggered by a red light illuminated to compel a high-voltage safety protocol. Conway ran into the grass and spun front first into the wall before the Tertre Rouge corner entry, ending testing with two minutes left; Toyota's No. 7 car required new front and rear bodywork.

Reshad de Gerus' No. 47 Cool Racing Oreca 07-Gibson car led LMP2 with a lap of 3:36.409, quicker than two Hypercar entries. Second and third in class were Paul-Loup Chatin's No. 48 IDEC Sport and Ferdinand Habsburg's No. 31 Team WRT cars. Louis Prette's No. 66 JMW Motorsport Ferrari from Ulysse de Pauw's No. 21 AF Corse Ferrari and Charlie Eastwood's No. 25 ORT by TF Aston Martin lead the last hour of LMGTE Am with a 3:56.623 lap. The safety car procedure was used for debris on the exit of the first Mulsanne chicane.

The weather improved for the second session, resulting in faster lap times and 80 km/h (50 mph) slow zones for incidents. Early in the session, Antonio Giovinazzi's No. 51 Ferrari was fastest overall at 3:29.504. Laurens Vanthoor's No. 6 Penske Porsche was second, 0.144 seconds slower. Third to fifth were Kobayashi's No. 7 Toyota, Fuoco's No. 50 Ferrari, and Felipe Nasr's No. 75 Penske Porsche (affected by a brake-by-wire issue that kept the car in the garage for much of the session). With a time of 3:35.472, Pietro Fittipaldi's No. 28 Jota entry led LMP2 ahead of Habsburg's No. 31 Team WRT and André Negrão's No. 35 Alpine. When Rodrigo Sales' No. 14 Nielsen Racing and Laurents Hörr's No. 48 IDEC vehicles collided at the Forest Esses at 1 hour, 35 minutes in, the safety car procedure was employed for 37 minutes. Both vehicles became beached in the gravel trap past the Dunlop Chicane. Ferrari were in the top three in LMGTE Am as Thomas Neubauer improved the No. 66 JMW Ferrari's first session lap to 3:56.088 to maintain its lead from Francesco Castellacci's No. 54 AF Corse and Daniel Serra's No. 57 Kessel Racing cars.

=== After testing ===
The No. 10 Vector Sport, No. 13 Tower Motorsports, No. 14 Nielsen, No. 30 Duqueine Team, No. 80 AF Corse and No. 923 Racing Team Turkey LMP2 teams were all assessed 20-minute stop-and-hold first practice session penalties for running ride height sensors during testing and outside of private testing, a violation of the vehicle's homologation.

== Practice ==
The first three-hour practice session occurred in warm and sunny weather on the afternoon of 7 June. Toyota led from the start with López's No. 7 car leading early on before his teammate Hartley in the No. 8 entry lapped quickest overall at 3:27.742 in the closing 23 minutes. The only other car in the 3:28 range was Bamber's No. 2 Cadillac, while the Porsches of Nasr's No. 75 and Kévin Estre's No. 6 cars were within half a second of Toyota's pace. Fittipaldi's No. 28 Jota car led LMP2 with a lap of 3:34.579, followed by Malthe Jakobsen's No. 37 Cool Pro/Am car. Mirko Bortolotti's No. 63 Prema entry was another 1.8 seconds back in third. Marco Sørensen No. 55 GMB Motorsport Aston Martin led LMGTE Am with a 3:55.020 lap, three-tenths of a second faster than Riccardo Pera's No. 86 GR Racing Porsche. Casper Stevenson's No. 777 D'station Racing Aston Martin crashed into the left-hand side Armco barrier before the Tertre Rouge corner and Steven Thomas' No. 13 Tower Motorsports entry hit the Aston Martin's drivers-side door at high speed after other cars avoided Stevenson's stationary car in the track's centre. Stevenson and Thomas were unhurt. Practice was stopped for 35 minutes to allow marshals and safety crews to repair the damaged barrier. Varrone had relieved Catsburg in the No. 33 Corvette when he also lost control of the car on a kerb into the Tertre Rouge corner and crashed rear first into the tyre barrier, ending the session with four minutes remaining. Corvette Racing replaced multiple components on the car to allow it to be driven in qualifying.

D'station and Tower Motorsports had to start from the back of the outright grid after their chassis, damaged beyond repair, were replaced during qualifying. The stewards deemed Thomas to have not slowed enough before hitting Stevenson and imposed a four-minute stop-and-hold penalty on Tower Motorsports to be served within four laps of its announcement after the race began.

The second session, which lasted two hours, took place later that evening. Laurens Vanthoor's No. 6 Penske Porsche set the fastest lap of 3:28.878 with just over half an hour remaining in the session. Calado was second with Dane Cameron's No. 5 Penske Porsche third. Cadillac was fourth following a lap by Bamber and Toyota finished fifth after a lap by Kobayashi. Alexander Sims' Action Express Racing (AXR) car suffered front-right bodywork and minor cluster damage during the session and was driven into the pit lane for repairs. Bortolotti led LMP2 with a lap of 3:36.863 set before the session ended in Prema's No. 63 car. Filipe Albuquerque in United Autosport's No. 22 car was two-tenths of a second behind in second and Fittipaldi's No. 28 Jota entry was third. Kei Cozzolino's No 74 Kessel car lapped at 3:53.796 to lead LMGTE Am. Cozzolino demoted Alessio Picariello's No. 60 Iron Lynx Porsche to second and Matteo Cairoli's No. 56 Project 1 – AO Porsche was third.

The third session, three hours long, took place in warm weather on the afternoon of 8 June. Toyota set the early pace with Kobayashi and Buemi leading early on before Fuoco's lap of 3:26.579 led overall late in the session. Pier Guidi was second-fastest in the final eight minutes after spending 90 minutes in the garage due to a faulty transmission. The Toyotas in third (Kobayashi) and fourth (Hartley) were almost three-tenths of a second apart with António Félix da Costa's No. 38 Jota Porsche fifth. Jota again led LMP2 with Fittipaldi lapping at 3:34.071 ahead of Mathias Beche's No. 14 Nielsen entry. Castellacci led LMGTE Am from Ben Barker's No. 86 GR Racing Porsche and Matteo Cressoni's No. 60 Iron Lynx Ferrari. Although the session was not stopped, some cars did go off the circuit. Habsburg crashed the No. 31 WRT LMP2 entry into the barrier exiting Indianapolis turn and Manuel Maldonado ended practice early with a Full Course Yellow (FCY) after beaching the No. 65 Panis Racing car in the second Mulsanne Chicane gravel.

The final session, held for an hour, occurred later that evening. Calado set a 3:27.275 lap to lead practice with Esteban Gutiérrez's No. 709 Glickenhaus, Will Stevens' No. 38 Jota Porsche, Estre's No. 6 Penske Porsche and Sims' AXR Cadillac in second to fifth. Jean-Éric Vergne's No. 93 Peugeot stopped on the right-hand side of the Mulsanne Straight with an electrical fault, and race director Eduardo Freitas red-flagged practice for 19 minutes after becoming annoyed with drivers driving on the right rather than the left. Freitas extended practice by 15 minutes when the session was resumed with 20 minutes to go. Dries Vanthoor set LMP2's fastest lap of 3:36.229 in the No. 923 Racing Team Turkey car ahead of Job van Uitert's No. 65 Panis and Bortolotti's No. 63 Prema entries. Ferraris had the two fastest times in LMGTE Am with the top lap being a 3:52.965 set by Neubauer's No. 66 JMW car ahead of Scott Huffaker's No. 57 Kessel entry and Picariello's No. 60 Iron Lynx Porsche.

== Qualifying ==
Divided into two sessions, an initial one-hour qualifying session decided the race's starting order, except for the fastest eight vehicles in each class, who qualified for a half-hour shootout, "Le Mans Hyperpole," which determined pole position in all three classes. Every Hypercar started upfront, regardless of lap time, followed by LMP2 and LMGTE Am. The eight qualifying Hyperpole cars were ordered by fastest Hyperpole-session lap time first, followed by the other non-qualifying class vehicles by fastest lap time set during the first qualifying session.

The fastest Hypercar lap was a 3:25.213 set by Fuoco's No. 50 Ferrari with 16 minutes left. Pier Guidi's sister No. 51 Ferrari was demoted to second by Fuoco and was hampered by a slower GTE Am Aston Martin in the track's final sector during his fastest lap. Kobayashi's No. 7 Toyota took third after leading the session early on with teammate Hartley in fourth. The final four Hyperpole qualifiers were Frédéric Makowiecki's No. 5 Penske Porsche, Sébastien Bourdais' No. 3 and Bamber's No. 2 Cadillacs as well as Nasr's No. 75 Penske Porsche (whose best lap was invalidated for using more than the maximum released powertrain power). Fittipaldi's No. 28 Jota along with Deletraz's No. 41 WRT, Bortolotti's No. 61 Prema cars, Vector Sport's Gabriel Aubry, IDEC's Chatin, Cool's de Gerus, Prema's other entry of Bent Viscaal and Nielsen's Ben Hanley (after Dries Vanthoor's fastest lap was deleted for insufficient slowing under red flag conditions) advanced to Hyperpole in LMP2.

In LMGTE Am, Rovera's No. 83 Richard Mille AF Corse Ferrari and Davide Rigon's No. 54 AF Corse Ferrari along with Catsburg's Corvette, Eastwood's ORT by TF car, Serra's No. 57 Kessel car, Sørensen's GMB Aston Martin, De Pauw's No. 21 AF Corse Ferrari and Cozzolino's No. 74 Kessel car qualified for Hyperpole. Separate incidents for Matthieu Vaxivière's No. 36 Alpine and Albuquerque's No. 22 United Autosport car colliding into the Ford Chicane that saw Vaxivière get beached in the gravel and Jakobsen's No. 37 Cool car hitting the barrier at Indianapolis turn led to stoppages during qualifying.

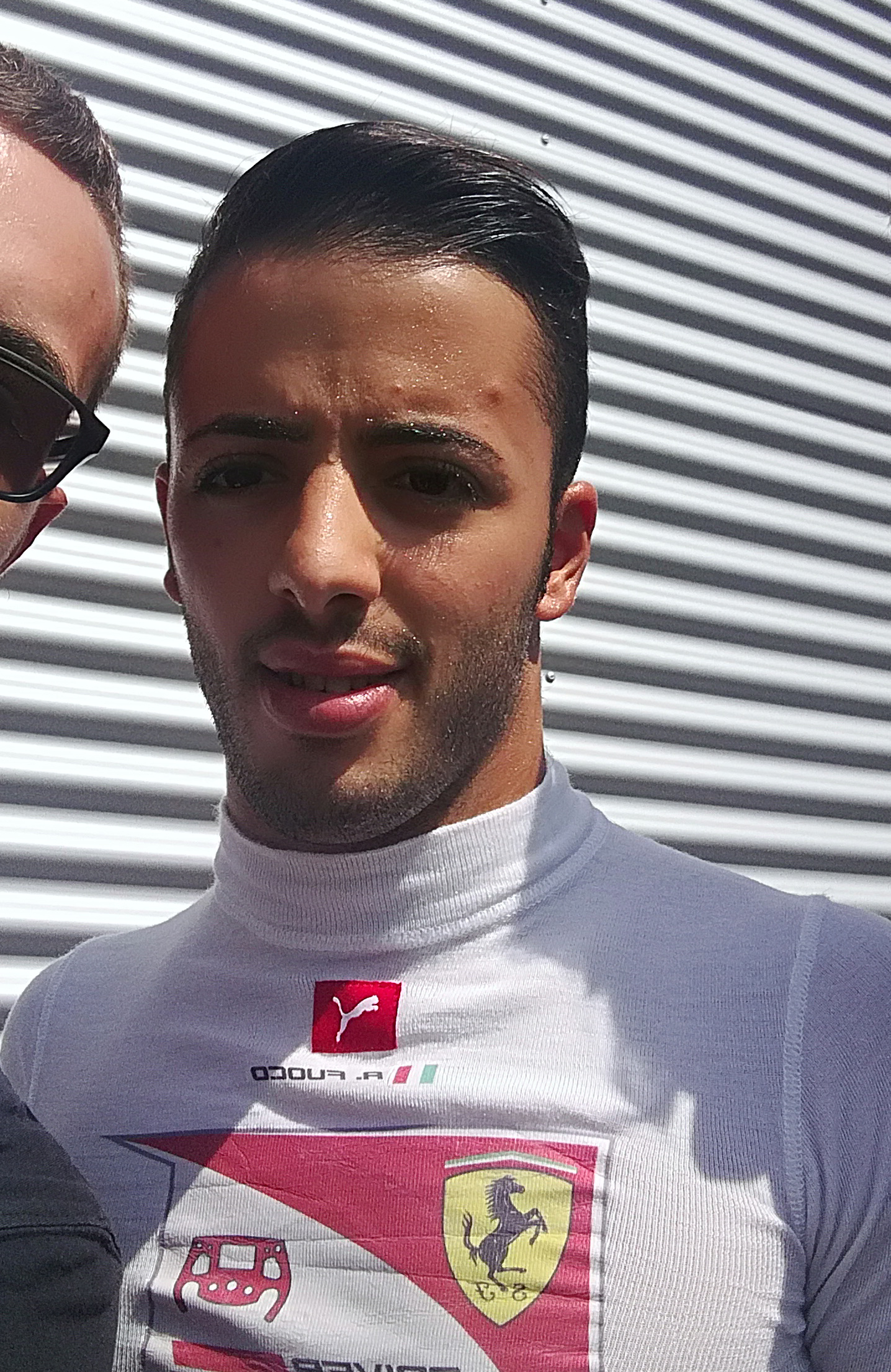
Antonio Fuoco (pictured in 2018) qualified fastest overall for Ferrari AF Corse in the marque's first Le Mans pole position for half a century.

Ferrari installed new tyres in Hyperpole, expecting Toyota to lap faster, and Fuoco and Pier Guidi drafted off each other as well as a Toyota. Fuoco's No. 50 Ferrari reset the Hypercar class record at 3:22.982 with eight minutes left for pole position despite Yorikatsu Tsujiko's LMGTE Am Kessel Ferrari slowing him into the left-hand Indianapolis corner and Arnage turn. It was Ferrari's first Le Mans pole since 1973, ending Toyota's streak of six consecutive poles extending back to 2017. It was also Ferrari's second pole of 2023 after the 1000 Miles of Sebring. Pier Guidi qualified the sister No. 51 Ferrari in second and held pole until Fuoco's lap. Hartley's No. 8 Toyota, Nasr's No. 75 Penske Porsche. Kobayashi's No. 7 Toyota, Bamber's No. 2 Cadillac, Makowiecki's No. 5 Penske Porsche and Bourdais' No. 3 Cadillac completed the top eight. The rear of Bourdais' car caught fire due to a burst high pressure fuel hose flooding it with engine fuel; he stopped at the first Mulsanne chicane for marshals and him to extinguish the fire, stopping Hyperpole with five minutes and 15 seconds left. The fire did not structurally damage the car but its engine was changed as a precaution.

LMP2 pole position was secured by Chatin's No. 48 IDEC entry with a lap of 3:32.923. Following in the top five were Fittipaldi's No. 28 Jota, Deletraz's No. 41 WRT, De Gerus' No. 47 Cool and Bortolotti's No. 63 Prema cars. Three of the four GTE manufacturers were represented in the top three in LMGTE Am. Keating's Corvette took the class pole position with a 3:52.376 time set on his final lap, ahead of Ahmad Al Harthy's ORT by TF Aston Martin and Thomas Flohr's No. 54 AF Corse Ferrari.

The FIA WEC Committee moved the Garage 56 No. 24 Hendrick Chevrolet to the rear of the LMP2 field, ahead of all GTE cars, at the request of all LMGTE Am entries, after it lapped faster than the GTE vehicles in testing and practice.

=== Qualifying results ===
Pole positions in each class are denoted in bold.

Final qualifying classification
| Pos. | Class | No. | Team | Qualifying | Hyperpole | Grid |
|---|---|---|---|---|---|---|
| **1** | **Hypercar** | **50** | **Ferrari AF Corse** | 3:25.213 | **3:22.982** | 1 |
| 2 | Hypercar | 51 | Ferrari AF Corse | 3:25.412 | 3:23.755 | 2 |
| 3 | Hypercar | 8 | Toyota Gazoo Racing | 3:25.749 | 3:24.451 | 3 |
| 4 | Hypercar | 75 | Porsche Penske Motorsport | 3:25.868 | 3:24.531 | 4 |
| 5 | Hypercar | 7 | Toyota Gazoo Racing | 3:25.485 | 3:24.933 | 5 |
| 6 | Hypercar | 2 | Cadillac Racing | 3:26.020 | 3:25.170 | 6 |
| 7 | Hypercar | 5 | Porsche Penske Motorsport | 3:25.848 | 3:25.176 | 7 |
| 8 | Hypercar | 3 | Cadillac Racing | 3:25.924 | 3:25.521 | 8 |
| 9 | Hypercar | 6 | Porsche Penske Motorsport | 3:26.900 | | 9 |
| 10 | Hypercar | 93 | Peugeot TotalEnergies | 3:27.260 | | 10 |
| 11 | Hypercar | 94 | Peugeot TotalEnergies | 3:27.850 | | 11 |
| 12 | Hypercar | 708 | Glickenhaus Racing | 3:28.497 | | 12 |
| 13 | Hypercar | 311 | Action Express Racing | 3:28.767 | | 13 |
| 14 | Hypercar | 709 | Glickenhaus Racing | 3:29.082 | | 14 |
| 15 | Hypercar | 4 | Floyd Vanwall Racing Team | 3:29.745 | | 15 |
| 16 | **LMP2** | **48** | **IDEC Sport** | 3:34.985 | **3:32.923** | 16 |
| 17 | LMP2 | 28 | Jota | 3:34.751 | 3:33.035 | 17 |
| 18 | LMP2 | 41 | Team WRT | 3:34.753 | 3:33.240 | 18 |
| 19 | LMP2 | 47 | Cool Racing | 3:35.105 | 3:33.580 | 19 |
| 20 | LMP2 | 63 | Prema Racing | 3:34.793 | 3:33.983 | 20 |
| 21 | **LMP2 Pro-Am** | **14** | **Nielsen Racing** | 3:35.453 | **3:34.021** | 21 |
| 22 | LMP2 | 9 | Prema Racing | 3:35.392 | 3:34.658 | 22 |
| 23 | LMP2 | 10 | Vector Sport | 3:34.985 | 3:35.091 | 23 |
| 24 | LMP2 Pro-Am | 45 | Algarve Pro Racing | 3:35.578 | | 24 |
| 25 | LMP2 | 22 | United Autosports | 3:35.587 | | 25 |
| 26 | LMP2 Pro-Am | 923 | Racing Team Turkey | 3:35.658 | | 26 |
| 27 | LMP2 | 65 | Panis Racing | 3:35.691 | | 27 |
| 28 | LMP2 | 34 | Inter Europol Competition | 3:35.755 | | 28 |
| 29 | LMP2 | 23 | United Autosports | 3:35.853 | | 29 |
| 30 | LMP2 | 31 | Team WRT | 3:35.853 | | 30 |
| 31 | LMP2 Pro-Am | 37 | Cool Racing | 3:36.271 | | 31 |
| 32 | LMP2 Pro-Am | 80 | AF Corse | 3:36.483 | | 32 |
| 33 | LMP2 Pro-Am | 43 | DKR Engineering | 3:37.146 | | 33 |
| 34 | LMP2 | 35 | Alpine Elf Team | 3:37.498 | | 34 |
| 35 | LMP2 | 30 | Duqueine Team | 3:37.584 | | 35 |
| 36 | LMP2 Pro-Am | 32 | Inter Europol Competition | 3:39.303 | | 36 |
| 37 | **Innovative Car** | **24** | **Hendrick Motorsports** | **3:47.976** | | 39 |
| 38 | LMP2 Pro-Am | 39 | Graff Racing | 3:49.288 | | 37 |
| 39 | **LMGTE Am** | **33** | **Corvette Racing** | 3:52.228 | **3:52.376** | 40 |
| 40 | LMGTE Am | 25 | ORT by TF | 3:52.431 | 3:53.905 | 41 |
| 41 | LMGTE Am | 54 | AF Corse | 3:51.914 | 3:54.582 | 42 |
| 42 | LMGTE Am | 21 | AF Corse | 3:52.968 | 3:54.744 | 43 |
| 43 | LMGTE Am | 83 | Richard Mille AF Corse | 3:51.877 | 3:55.033 | 44 |
| 44 | LMGTE Am | 57 | Kessel Racing | 3:52.459 | 3:55.637 | 45 |
| 45 | LMGTE Am | 55 | GMB Motorsport | 3:52.484 | 3:57.240 | 46 |
| 46 | LMGTE Am | 74 | Kessel Racing | 3:53.263 | 3:59.648 | 47 |
| 47 | LMGTE Am | 77 | Dempsey-Proton Racing | 3:53.481 | | 48 |
| 48 | LMGTE Am | 86 | GR Racing | 3:53.531 | | 49 |
| 49 | LMGTE Am | 100 | Walkenhorst Motorsport | 3:53.590 | | 50 |
| 50 | LMGTE Am | 85 | Iron Dames | 3:53.603 | | 51 |
| 51 | LMGTE Am | 60 | Iron Lynx | 3:53.626 | | 52 |
| 52 | LMGTE Am | 72 | TF Sport | 3:53.703 | | 53 |
| 53 | LMGTE Am | 56 | Project 1 – AO | 3:53.947 | | 54 |
| 54 | LMGTE Am | 911 | Proton Competition | 3:54.129 | | 55 |
| 55 | LMGTE Am | 16 | Proton Competition | 3:54.293 | | 56 |
| 56 | LMGTE Am | 98 | NorthWest AMR | 3:54.498 | | 57 |
| 57 | LMGTE Am | 66 | JMW Motorsport | 3:55.991 | | 58 |
| 58 | LMGTE Am | 88 | Proton Competition | 3:58.486 | | 59 |
| 59 | LMP2 | 36 | Alpine Elf Team | 3:59.171 | | 38 |
| 60 | Hypercar | 38 | Hertz Team Jota | No Time | | 60 |
| 61 | LMP2 Pro-Am | 13 | Tower Motorsports | No Time | | 61 |
| 62 | LMGTE Am | 777 | D'station Racing | No Time | | 62 |

== Warm-up ==
The ACO scheduled a 15-minute warm-up session for teams to check their cars on 10 June at midday, in varied conditions with teams running slick tyres and recording slower lap times. Calado lapped fastest at 3:30.113, 2.846 seconds ahead of teammate Nielsen. The rest of the top five consisted of Bourdais, Nico Müller's No. 94 Peugeot and Conway. Tom Blomqvist's No. 23 United Autosports car led LMP2 with a lap of 3:39.818 from Fabio Scherer's No. 34 Inter Europol and Beche's No. 14 Nielsen cars. Kessel paced LMGTE Am with Serra's 3:55.038 lap leading teammate Cozzolino. Although there were no major incidents, Nicolas Lapierre stopped the No. 37 Cool entry at the side of the track at the exit of Arnage corner before restarting.

== Race ==
=== Start and early hours ===
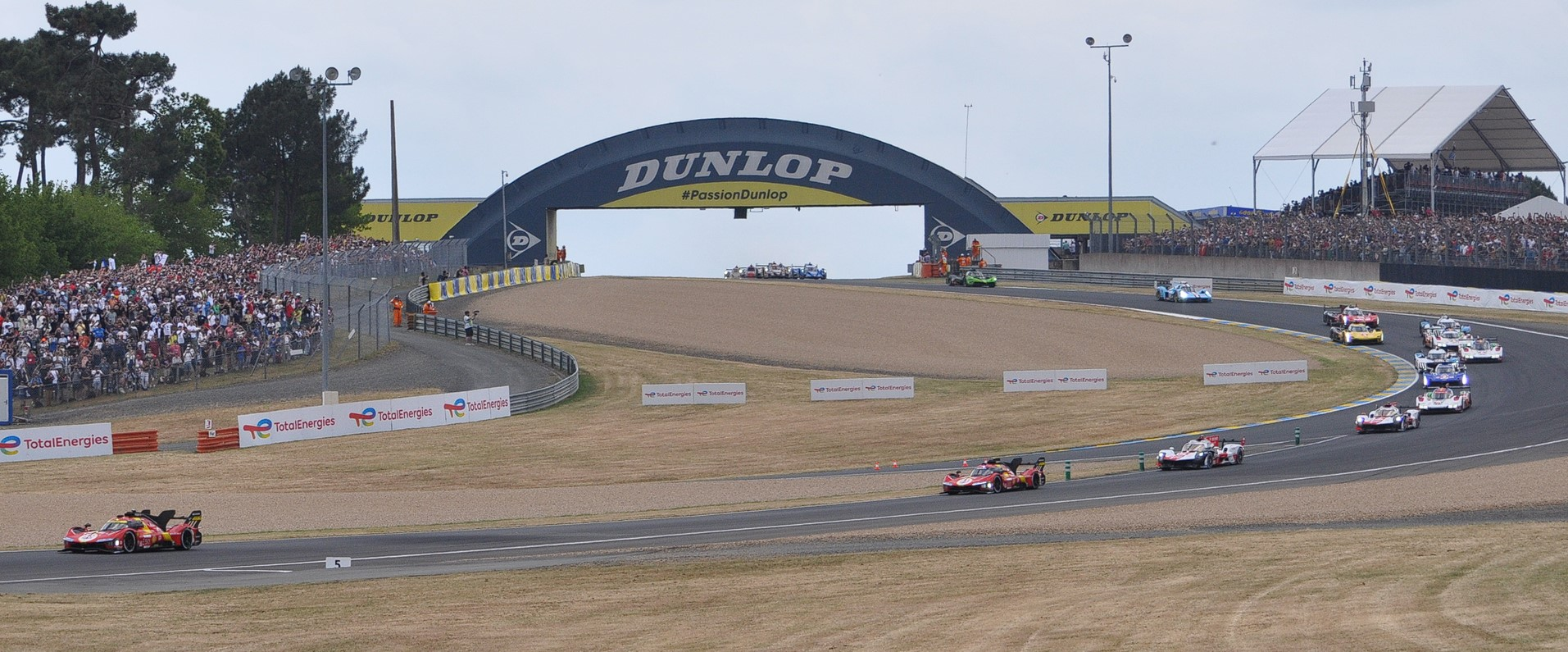
The start of the race

Rainfall between the warm-up session and race start created mixed conditions around the circuit. The air temperature was between 18.2 to 26.4 °C (64.8 to 79.5 °F), while the track temperature ranged from 21 to 48 °C (70 to 118 °F); rain was forecast for the afternoon of 10 June. Basketball player LeBron James waved the French tricolor to start the race before 325,000 spectators at 16:00 CEST, which was led by the pole-sitter Nicklas Nielsen's No. 50 Ferrari. A total of 62 cars were scheduled to start the race, but the No. 708 Glickenhaus was in the garage having gearbox seal repairs arising from a differential setup change. The larger Hypercar field and driver behaviour meant greater risks were made while lapping slower vehicles. In the first hour, Buemi took the lead from Calado's No. 50 and Nielsen's No. 51 Ferraris on the outside entering Indianapolis Corner, while two incidents further down the field necessitated the first safety car intervention. Jack Aitken lost traction in the No. 311 AXR Cadillac's rear tyres on the damp track leaving the first Mulsanne Straight chicane. The car's front-left was heavily against the left-hand side Armco barrier. Mark Kvamme spun the No. 32 Inter Europol car into the gravel trap. Under the safety car, repairs to the barrier and debris cleanup took 35 minutes as Aitken returned to the garage for repairs and Kvamme was extricated from the gravel.

When racing resumed, Conway's No. 7 Toyota was duelling Calado's No. 51 Ferrari for second as Rigon moved the No. 54 AF Corse Ferrari into the LMGTE Am lead when Catsburg's No. 33 Corvette was one of several GTE cars to pit under safety car conditions. Following Aitken's incident, Daniil Kvyat's second-placed No. 63 LMP2 Prema car entered the pit lane for a lengthy stop to remove debris in the air intake. Catsburg drove the No. 33 Corvette into the garage during the second hour to repair a faulty front-right damper and Keating rejoined the race two laps down in LMGTE Am. Accidents for Sales' No. 14 Nielsen car into the outside tyre barrier approaching Dunlop corner, which removed the car's front-right, and Ricky Taylor's No. 13 Tower vehicle against the inside barrier at high speed in Arnage turn prompted the retirement of both cars and the implementation of a slow zone. Midway through the second hour, De Pauw's No. 21 AF Corse Ferrari was caught out by Bourdais' No. 3 Cadillac slowing for the slow zone and rammed into Bourdais' rear under the Dunlop Bridge. Gustav Birch's No. 55 GMB Aston Martin was also involved in the incident, and both his and De Pauw's cars were retired. While Bourdais drove the No. 3 Cadillac to the garage for rear-end repairs, Birch and De Pauw were unhurt.

Kubica's No. 41 WRT car took the LMP2 lead while Porsche had the first four places in LMGTE Am with Cairoli's No. 56 Project 1 car leading the category. Claudio Schiavoni's No. 60 Iron Lynx Porsche hit the inside kerb too hard on the entry to Tertre Rouge corner and spun into Ryan Hardwick's No. 16 Wright Motorsports front-right corner during the third hour. Both vehicles incurred enough damage to be retired from the race. Soon after, Lubin's No. 22 United Autosports car spun out of Tertre Rouge corner and collided with Mikkel O. Pedersen's No. 77 Proton Porsche's right-hand side. Both vehicles returned to the garage for repairs. Heavy rain fell from Indianapolis corner to the start/finish straight before the end of the third hour, and several vehicles were caught off guard by the sudden drop in grip while braking and leaving turns on slick tyres. Pera's LMGTE Am-class leading No. 86 GR Porsche spun rear-first into the inside barrier. Wadoux spun the No. 83 Richard Mille Ferrari and crashed backwards into the Porsche Curves right-hand side wall at high speed and underwent precautionary checks at the track's medical centre. Her car's sustained a broken toe-link but she was not seriously injured. Aquaplaning cars prompted a second safety car deployment as Rigon moved the No. 54 AF Corse Ferrari to the LMGTE Am lead.

During the safety car period, pit stop cycles in which teams switched to wet-weather tyres saw Menezes take the overall lead, with Estre's No. 6 Penske Porsche second. Sarah Bovy's No. 85 Iron Dames Porsche became the new LMGTE Am leader. The rain ceased soon after and teams began switching back to slick tyres as the track dried. Vergne beached the No. 93 Peugeot in the gravel at Mulsanne corner, extending the safety car period as it was tended to. After the safety car period ended, Ye's No. 38 Jota Porsche moved from sixth to the race lead into Indianapolis corner. Cameron moved the No. 5 Penske Porsche to second overall before being passed by the Ferrari 499Ps. He was imposed a drive-through penalty for passing the No. 100 Walkenhorst GTE Ferrari during the safety car period. Ye lost the overall lead when he lost control of the No. 38 Jota Porsche, removing its rear end assembly and engine cover in a high-speed sideways impact against the tyre barrier leaving the Porsche Curves. The car was repaired in the garage by mechanics for 20 minutes and four laps and Giovinazzi's No. 51 Ferrari took the lead. The debris on the circuit caused a Full Course Yellow.

=== Night to morning ===
As night fell, LMGTE Am became a duel between JMW's Giacomo Petrobelli, AF Corse's Flohr and Iron Dames' Michelle Gatting, while Ramussen's No. 28 Jota, Jakub Śmiechowski's No. 34 Inter Europol and Oliver Jarvis' No. 23 United Autosport entrants battled the LMP2 lead. Heavy rain again fell on parts of the circuit and reduced visibility in the seventh hour and more vehicles were caught out by the changing conditions as they made pit stops for wet-weather tyres. Petrobelli got the JMW Ferrari beached in the gravel at Karting turn, causing heavy rear-end damage and requiring extrication. The car lost the LMGTE Am lead to Iron Dames' Gatting before being passed by Cairoli's No. 56 Project 1 car. Rasmussen's No. 28 Jota car had a frontal crash in the Porsche Curves but drove slowly to the pit lane for repairs and Scherer's No. 34 Inter Europol car took the LMP2 lead in the seventh hour. Pier Guidi then lost control of the race-leading No. 51 Ferrari while attempting to avoid colliding with the No. 911 Proton Porsche that had hit a Glickenhaus ahead of him in the Daytona Chicane. He recovered with vehicular assistance and lost the race lead to Müller's No. 94 Peugeot.

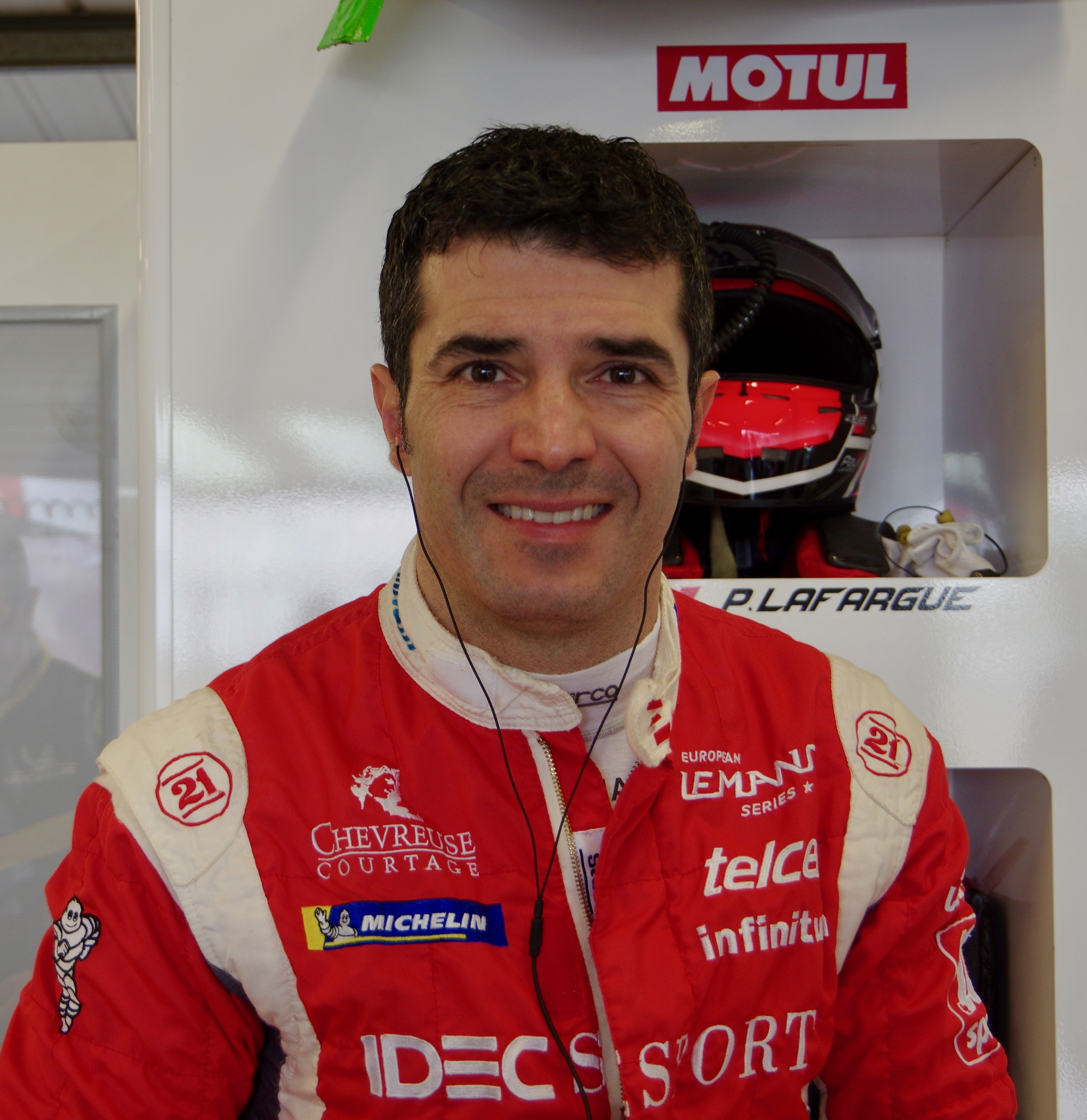
Memo Rojas (pictured in 2019) was involved in a ninth hour four-car collision that prompted the race's third and final safety car period.

Kobayashi slowed at Tertre Rouge corner in the ninth hour to avoid passing Giedo van der Garde's No. 39 Graff car into a slow zone enforced for Pier Guidi's accident. Prette's JMW Ferrari was caught off guard by Van der Garde and hit the No. 7 Toyota's left rear, while Memo Rojas' No. 35 Alpine struck the Toyota's right rear. Prette collided with the rear of Van der Garde's car, causing race-ending damage to the JMW Ferrari and the No. 7 Toyota. Although no driver was hurt, Prette was taken to the medical centre for evaluation. A third safety car period was used to allow marshals to clear debris at Tertre Rouge corner and to recover the damaged cars. The accidents promoted Bamber's No. 2 Cadillac to third and Pier Guidi's No. 51 Ferrari to fourth. Because a large piece of Kevlar became caught in the suspension and blocked the cooler's flow, the No. 8 Toyota's engine began overheating at the same time as the No. 7 car's collision. When racing resumed, Hirakawa's No. 8 Toyota followed Bourdais's No. 3 Cadillac past Müller's No. 94 Peugeot for the race lead at the Dunlop chicane. Kvyat's No. 63 Prema LMP2 car slid sideways into the tyre barrier in the Porsche Curves. He was unhurt but heavy rear-end damage forced the vehicle's retirement. Fuoco entered the garage to repair a front leak caused by a stone damaging the front-right brake radiator. The No. 50 Ferrari lost six laps and dropped out of the race lead duel.

René Binder and Neel Jani's Duqueine car joined the LMP2 lead duel with Śmiechowski's and Scherer's No. 34 Inter Europol and Andrade's No. 41 Jota entries in the 10th hour. Müller's No. 94 Peugeot regained the race lead during the following hour, but was passed by Buemi's No. 8 Toyota on the run from Mulsanne to Indianapolis. Calado used the No. 51 Ferrari's better straightline pace on the straight into the Indianapolis turn to pass Müller's No. 94 Peugeot on the inside and take second place. At the first Mulsanne chicane, Menezes slipped onto the wet gravel and skidded into the tyre barrier. Menezes limped the damaged No. 94 Peugeot back to the pits for eight laps of front-end repairs. Calado took the lead when Ferrari did not replace the tyres on the No. 51 Ferrari and instead only refuel it at pit stops. After Serra's quick laps, Kessel joined the LMGTE Am lead duel. De Gerus damaged the No. 37 Cool entry's front-left and rear-left suspension against the barrier at the exit to the first opening of the Porsche Curves during the 13th hour. He brought the car into the garage to be retired with tub damage.

Early in the morning, the race lead was shared by Hirakawa's No. 8 Toyota and Pier Guidi's No. 51 Ferrari, and both cars were on the same pit stop strategy. Jonas Ried's No. 88 Proton Porsche collided with the outside barrier entering the Indianapolis corner, forcing the car to withdraw and the wall to be repaired. Ben Barnicoat's No. 80 AF Corse LMP2 Pro/Am car attempted to overtake slower vehicles through the Porsche Curves not long after. Barnicoat hit the inside kerb and the barrier hard enough with his left side to force its retirement after 15 hours. Kessel's No. 57 Ferrari had become the LMGTE Am leader by this stage thanks to steady pace from drivers Serra and Huffaker, as well as pit stop strategy. After passing Al Harthy's No. 25 ORT by TF car under the Dunlop Bridge, Pera's No. 86 GR Porsche moved to third in class before Scherer passed Kubica in the LMP2 duel for first. Hirakawa's front bodywork and a slow right-rear puncture were replaced during a pit stop after he ran over a squirrel at around 7:00 a.m. local time, removing front downforce from the No. 8 Toyota. This returned Calado's No. 51 Ferrari to the race lead.

While lapping the No. 31 WRT LMP2 entry in the 17th hour, Estre's No. 6 Porsche hit the inside kerb in the Porsche Curves, severely damaging the car's floor against the tyre barrier. The car dropped out of a duel for fourth with Bourdais' No. 3 Cadillac after 43 minutes of bodywork and floor repairs in the garage. LMP2 remained a battle between Kubica's No. 41 Jota and Smiechowski's No. 34 Inter Europol cars, while LMGTE Am was a duel between Iron Dames' Frey and Project 1's Cairoli, and Catsburg and Keating's No. 33 Corvette moved to third in class after returning to the lead lap through pace and a safety car wave-by as the circuit dried. Eastwood's No. 25 ORT by TF Aston Martin pace and pit stop strategy allowed him to join the LMGTE Am lead duel as Keating passed P. J. Hyett's No. 56 Project 1 Porsche for second in class in the 18th hour. Pier Guidi's No. 51 Ferrari lost the lead to Buemi's No. 8 Toyota because he needed to power cycle the No. 51 Ferrari, which had difficulty restarting from his pit box due to a cockpit communications system failure, but reclaimed it by passing Buemi on the outside through slower LMP2 traffic into the second Mulsanne chicane. The gap between both drivers was small until Molina's No. 50 Ferrari attempted to regain a lap from Hartley's No. 8 Toyota, allowing Calado's No. 51 Ferrari to pull away. Actor Michael Fassbender lost control of the No. 911 Proton Porsche's rear exiting Karting corner, crashing into the tyre barrier hard enough to force the car to retire with rear-right damage after 20 hours.

=== Afternoon to finish ===
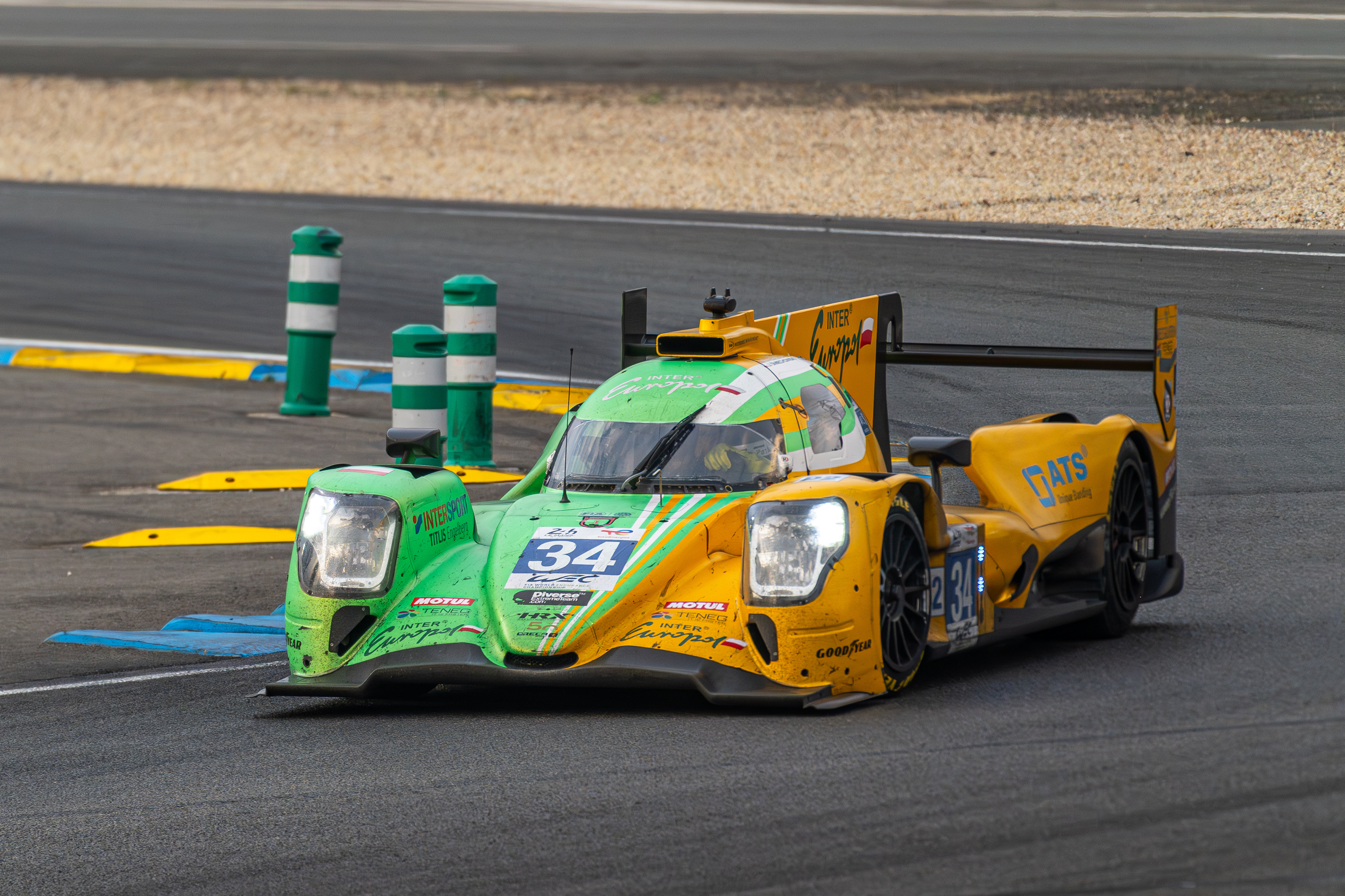
The No. 34 Inter Europol Competition Oreca 07-Gibson car led the final 112 laps of the LMP2 category to secure their first World Endurance Championship victory.

In the 21st hour, Inter Europol's No. 34 car received a drive-through penalty for overtaking two vehicles under safety car conditions, although it did not lose the LMP2 lead to Kubica. Varrone's 33 Corvette set a series of quick laps to take the LMGTE Am lead from Bovy's No. 85 Iron Dames Ferrari and the No. 25 ORT by TF car of Al Harthy. He and Catsburg extended the Corvette's lead to more than 70 seconds over Gatting's Iron Dames Porsche who was being caught by Eastwood's No. 25 ORT by TF Aston Martin. Hartley closed to less than ten seconds of overall leader Giovinazzi's No. 51 Ferrari by the 22nd hour while Nielsen's sister No. 50 Ferrari returned to fifth overall after Mikkel Jensen's No. 93 Peugeot entered the garage with a hydraulics issue. Hirakawa, who replaced Hartley, spun into the left-hand side guardrail barriers entering the right-hand Arnage corner after locking the rear brakes in the braking zone due to a rearward brake balance setting that he was unaware of with 1 hour and 45 minutes remaining. He entered the pit lane to have mechanics replace the damaged front and rear bodywork before rejoining the track nearly a lap behind Giovinazzi's No. 51 Ferrari. In the 23rd hour, Iron Dames lost second in LMGTE Am to Eastwood's No. 25 ORT by TF car who passed Frey's No. 85 Iron Dames Ferrari on the inside into the first Mulsanne chicane after a short battle and began pulling away.

Although the No. 51 Ferrari underwent a system reset at its final pit stop in the final hour, Pier Guidi maintained the lead the car had held for the last 55 laps and won after 342 laps; it was Calado's, Giovinazzi's and Pier Guidi's maiden overall Le Mans victory, (Note: Calado and Pier Guidi had finished first at Le Mans driving for AF Corse in the LMGTE Pro category in 2019 and 2021.) Ferrari's tenth and its first since 1965. They finished 1 minute, 21.793 seconds ahead of the No. 8 Toyota, with the No. 2 Cadillac finishing one lap behind in third place, despite losing time due to frequent oil replenishing during pit stops arising from an engine oil issue from the third hour. Inter Europol led the final 112 laps in LMP2 despite radio communication issues in the final hour, (Note: Inter Europol Competition were given a reprimand for using a coloured signalling board, deemed a "minor violation" of the race's supplementary regulations. They had been penalised five more seconds for fuelling before the engine was switched off during the 20th hour but this was revoked after further investigation by the stewards.) earning their first WEC LMP2 victory and second since the ALMS 4 Hours of Dubai. Jota's No. 41 team finished second 21.015 seconds later, and Duqueine finished third despite their car's right-front suspension failing at the final chicane on the final lap. Algarve Pro's No. 45 team of James Allen, Colin Braun and George Kurtz despite a puncture and functioning accident data recorder needing replacing won the LMP2 Pro/Am subclass by five laps over the No. 37 Cool trio of Alexandre Coigny, Jakobsen and Lapierre. It was Allen's second subclass win, as well as Braun's and Kurtz's first. In the final LMGTE Am and GTE race at Le Mans, Corvette had their ninth Le Mans GTE victory with their C8.R leading the ORT by TF Aston Martin by one lap. It was Keating's second category win and Catsburg's and Varrone's first. 40 of the 62 starting vehicles completed the event, the lowest number since 2015.

== Post-race ==
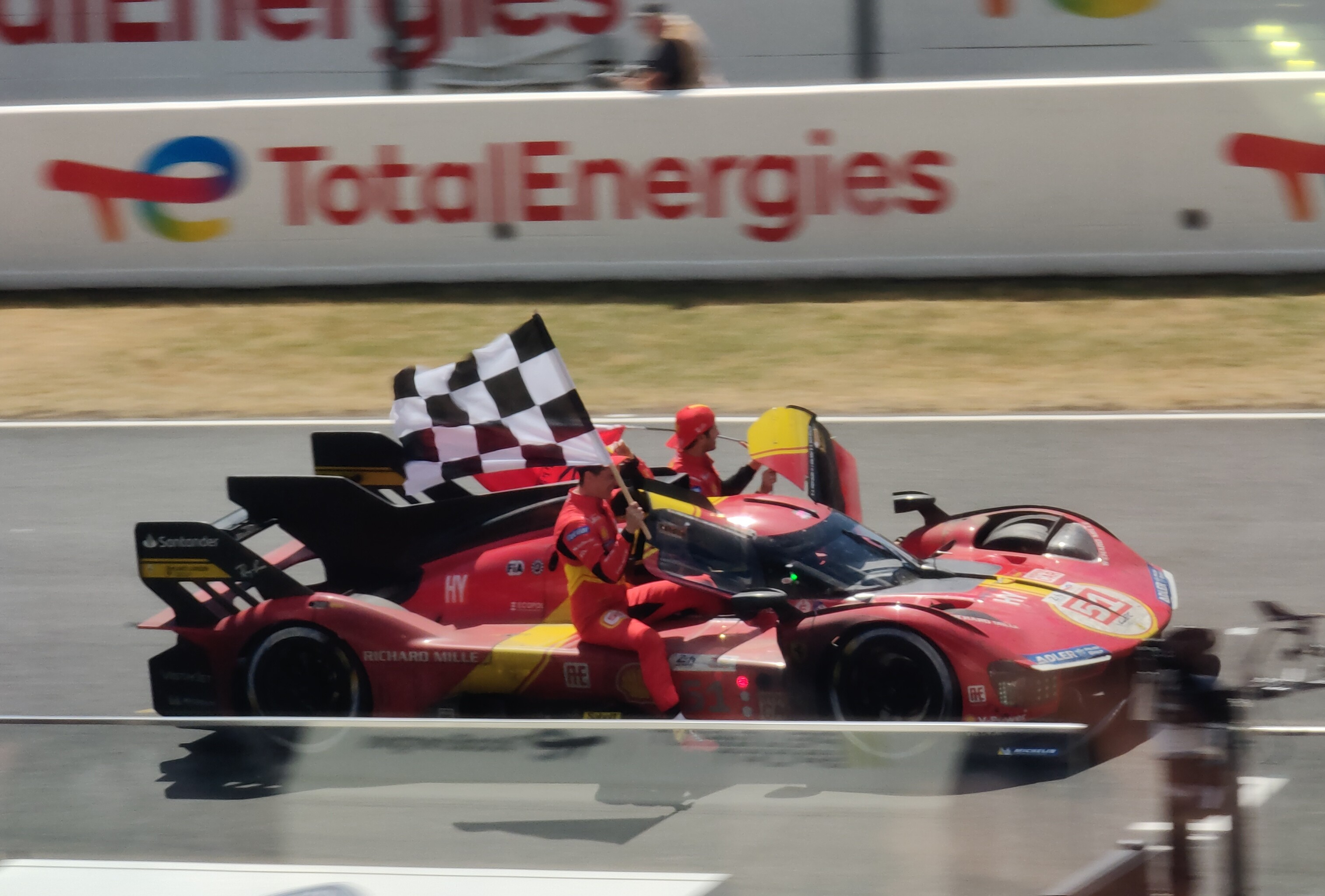
The No. 51 Ferrari 499P being driven towards the pit lane exit after winning the race.

The top three teams in each of the four classes appeared on the podium to collect their trophies and spoke to the media at individual press conferences. Giovinazzi said it was "by no means a given" that Ferrari would finish the race but added that they "should be very proud" of the victory. Calado called it "a great achievement after so long, this will go down in history." Pier Guidi said "As an Italian, I have dreamed of driving for this brand since childhood. Now it's real. We won Le Mans with a red car." Ferrari chairman John Elkann described the win as an "unforgettable day" and that winning a competitive, wet-weather affected 24-hour race "serves as an example for us all." Hartley was disappointed but proud to finish second, and disclosed that Toyota instructed Hirakawa to push hard in order to win the race. Hirakawa felt a lot of pressure relieving Hartley for his final stint and did not expect abnormal car behaviour into the Indianapolis corner. Bamber felt Cadillac "had a nearly perfect race" through wet-weather strategy and Westbrook felt his team deserved to finish third after being told they were lucky. Lynn said that the presence of spectators distinguished his third-place overall finish from his 2020 LMGTE Pro victory when no fans could watch at Le Mans.

Porsche LMDh factory director Urs Kuratle believed the three Penske cars could have competed on pace with the No. 2 Cadillac if not for technical issues, adding: "It was not our race, definitely not. But next year, we'll come back strong." Ye said visibility issues caused his accident and Jota owner Sam Hignett added that the Hypercar's windscreen becomes more dirty than an LMP2 car's. Toyota technical director Pascal Vasselon said Toyota did not blame Hirakawa for his crash.

Scherer, whose left foot was broken after departing Inter Europol's No. 34 car during a third lap pit stop, had his crew adjust run plans to allow for rest, and treatment permitted him to continue driving, saying: "I tried to just go for it because winning Le Mans is the biggest thing for me to achieve in Europe, in motorsport. I was a bit like, 'I just go through, it doesn't matter what it costs.' Because I'm living for that and that's my dream. That you don't give up for a foot that gives you some pain." Catsburg stated that he did not observe Scherer as he entered his pit box and blamed the crash on a miscommunication. Checks revealed that Scherer's mid-left foot had an incomplete fracture and ligament damage. He was cleared for the following 6 Hours of Monza. WRT owner Vincent Vosse voiced his dissatisfaction at finishing second in LMP2, which was heightened as the team had lost the class victory on the final lap of the 2021 race due to a throttle sensor issue. Kubica said Inter Europol's competitiveness made WRT keep trying to pressure them to no avail but added that he was proud of his achievements at Le Mans.

Catsburg stated he did not think a comeback from two laps down to win the race was possible, calling it "insane" that Corvette's pace allowed his team to re-enter LMGTE Am contention. Keating described Corvette's comeback from pole position as a "emotional rollercoaster," but was enraged by the then-class leader being released from the pit lane too soon under safety car conditions in wet weather in the third hour and race control failing to correct the error, preventing Corvette from receiving a wave-by. Iron Dames' regret at not finishing on the LMGTE Am podium after duelling for the class lead was voiced by Bovy, while co-driver Gatting said that they were hindered by a brake replacement.

Bourdais argued that De Pauw had collided with him because "there was no next slow to say that slow zone 2 was still active. And the GT guys were nose-to-tail. I don't know what he was doing, but he basically forgot that the next one was yellow again. He just plowed into us." Kobayashi said of his accident: "It's so painful to end the race like this because we did the race pretty well and were running P3, catching up. It's very tough." Bourdais thought the Le Mans slow zone system was overly long and dangerous and advised that some slow zones be deactivated rather than having them along a long stretch of track. Kobayashi suggested that FCY to instruct every car to immediately slow to 80 km/h (50 mph) regardless of their location on the circuit be used more often for safety reasons.

The result kept Buemi, Hartley and Hirakawa atop the Hypercar Drivers' Championship with 102 points; race winners Calado, Giovinazzi and Pier Guidi moved from fifth to second, 25 points behind. Deletraz, Kubica and Andrade took the Endurance Trophy for LMP2 Drivers lead ahead of class victors Costa, Scherer and Śmiechowski. Catsburg, Keating and Varrone retained the Endurance Trophy for LMGTE Am Drivers points lead over Al Harthy, Eastwood and Michael Dinan. Toyota, the No. 41 Team WRT and No. 33 Corvette teams left Le Mans as the Hypercar World Endurance Championship, LMP2 Endurance Trophy for Teams and LMGTE Am Endurance Trophy for Teams leaders, respectively, with three races remaining in the season.

== Official results ==
The minimum number of laps for classification at the finish (70 per cent of the overall race winner's distance) was 239 laps. Class winners are denoted in bold and with ‡. (Note: The final race classification remained provisional until July 2023 following the completion of an ACO and FIA investigation into the compliance of components that were impounded from six cars by both bodies during post-race scrutineering. All of the impounded components were found to comply with their respective technical regulations.)

Final race classification
| Pos | Class | No. | Team | Drivers | Chassis | Tyre | Laps | Time/Reason |
| Pos | Class | No. | Team | Drivers | Engine | Tyre | Laps | Time/Reason |
|---|---|---|---|---|---|---|---|---|
| 1 | **Hypercar** | **51** | **(Italy) Ferrari AF Corse** | **(United Kingdom) James Calado (Italy) Antonio Giovinazzi (Italy) Alessandro Pier Guidi** | **Ferrari 499P** | M | **342** | **24:00:18.099‡** |
| 1 | **Hypercar** | **51** | **(Italy) Ferrari AF Corse** | **(United Kingdom) James Calado (Italy) Antonio Giovinazzi (Italy) Alessandro Pier Guidi** | **Ferrari F163 3.0 L Turbo V6** | M | **342** | **24:00:18.099‡** |
| 2 | Hypercar | 8 | (Japan) Toyota Gazoo Racing | (Switzerland) Sébastien Buemi (New Zealand) Brendon Hartley (Japan) Ryō Hirakawa | Toyota GR010 Hybrid | M | 342 | +1:21.793 |
| 2 | Hypercar | 8 | (Japan) Toyota Gazoo Racing | (Switzerland) Sébastien Buemi (New Zealand) Brendon Hartley (Japan) Ryō Hirakawa | Toyota H8909 3.5 L Turbo V6 | M | 342 | +1:21.793 |
| 3 | Hypercar | 2 | (United States) Cadillac Racing | (New Zealand) Earl Bamber (United Kingdom) Alex Lynn (United Kingdom) Richard Westbrook | Cadillac V-Series.R | M | 341 | +1 lap |
| 3 | Hypercar | 2 | (United States) Cadillac Racing | (New Zealand) Earl Bamber (United Kingdom) Alex Lynn (United Kingdom) Richard Westbrook | Cadillac LMC55R 5.5 L V8 | M | 341 | +1 lap |
| 4 | Hypercar | 3 | (United States) Cadillac Racing | (France) Sébastien Bourdais (New Zealand) Scott Dixon (Netherlands) Renger van der Zande | Cadillac V-Series.R | M | 340 | +2 laps |
| 4 | Hypercar | 3 | (United States) Cadillac Racing | (France) Sébastien Bourdais (New Zealand) Scott Dixon (Netherlands) Renger van der Zande | Cadillac LMC55R 5.5 L V8 | M | 340 | +2 laps |
| 5 | Hypercar | 50 | (Italy) Ferrari AF Corse | (Italy) Antonio Fuoco (Spain) Miguel Molina (Denmark) Nicklas Nielsen | Ferrari 499P | M | 337 | +5 laps |
| 5 | Hypercar | 50 | (Italy) Ferrari AF Corse | (Italy) Antonio Fuoco (Spain) Miguel Molina (Denmark) Nicklas Nielsen | Ferrari F163 3.0 L Turbo V6 | M | 337 | +5 laps |
| 6 | Hypercar | 708 | (United States) Glickenhaus Racing | (Australia) Ryan Briscoe (France) Romain Dumas (France) Olivier Pla | Glickenhaus SCG 007 LMH | M | 335 | +7 laps |
| 6 | Hypercar | 708 | (United States) Glickenhaus Racing | (Australia) Ryan Briscoe (France) Romain Dumas (France) Olivier Pla | Glickenhaus P21 3.5 L Turbo V8 | M | 335 | +7 laps |
| 7 | Hypercar | 709 | (United States) Glickenhaus Racing | (France) Nathanaël Berthon (Mexico) Esteban Gutiérrez (France) Franck Mailleux | Glickenhaus SCG 007 LMH | M | 333 | +9 laps |
| 7 | Hypercar | 709 | (United States) Glickenhaus Racing | (France) Nathanaël Berthon (Mexico) Esteban Gutiérrez (France) Franck Mailleux | Glickenhaus P21 3.5 L Turbo V8 | M | 333 | +9 laps |
| 8 | Hypercar | 93 | (France) Peugeot TotalEnergies | (United Kingdom) Paul di Resta (Denmark) Mikkel Jensen (France) Jean-Éric Vergne | Peugeot 9X8 | M | 330 | +12 laps |
| 8 | Hypercar | 93 | (France) Peugeot TotalEnergies | (United Kingdom) Paul di Resta (Denmark) Mikkel Jensen (France) Jean-Éric Vergne | Peugeot X6H 2.6 L Turbo V6 | M | 330 | +12 laps |
| 9 | **LMP2** | **34** | **(Poland) Inter Europol Competition** | **(Spain) Albert Costa (Switzerland) Fabio Scherer (Poland) Jakub Śmiechowski** | **Oreca 07** | G | **328** | **+14 laps‡** |
| 9 | **LMP2** | **34** | **(Poland) Inter Europol Competition** | **(Spain) Albert Costa (Switzerland) Fabio Scherer (Poland) Jakub Śmiechowski** | **Gibson GK428 4.2 L V8** | G | **328** | **+14 laps‡** |
| 10 | LMP2 | 41 | (Belgium) Team WRT | (Angola) Rui Andrade (Switzerland) Louis Delétraz (Poland) Robert Kubica | Oreca 07 | G | 328 | +14 laps |
| 10 | LMP2 | 41 | (Belgium) Team WRT | (Angola) Rui Andrade (Switzerland) Louis Delétraz (Poland) Robert Kubica | Gibson GK428 4.2 L V8 | G | 328 | +14 laps |
| 11 | LMP2 | 30 | (France) Duqueine Team | (Austria) René Binder (Switzerland) Neel Jani (Chile) Nico Pino | Oreca 07 | G | 327 | +15 laps |
| 11 | LMP2 | 30 | (France) Duqueine Team | (Austria) René Binder (Switzerland) Neel Jani (Chile) Nico Pino | Gibson GK428 4.2 L V8 | G | 327 | +15 laps |
| 12 | LMP2 | 36 | (France) Alpine Elf Team | (France) Julien Canal (France) Charles Milesi (France) Matthieu Vaxivière | Oreca 07 | G | 327 | +15 laps |
| 12 | LMP2 | 36 | (France) Alpine Elf Team | (France) Julien Canal (France) Charles Milesi (France) Matthieu Vaxivière | Gibson GK428 4.2 L V8 | G | 327 | +15 laps |
| 13 | LMP2 | 31 | (Belgium) Team WRT | (Netherlands) Robin Frijns (Indonesia) Sean Gelael (Austria) Ferdinand Habsburg | Oreca 07 | G | 327 | +15 laps |
| 13 | LMP2 | 31 | (Belgium) Team WRT | (Netherlands) Robin Frijns (Indonesia) Sean Gelael (Austria) Ferdinand Habsburg | Gibson GK428 4.2 L V8 | G | 327 | +15 laps |
| 14 | LMP2 | 48 | (France) IDEC Sport | (France) Paul-Loup Chatin (Germany) Laurents Hörr (France) Paul Lafargue | Oreca 07 | G | 327 | +15 laps |
| 14 | LMP2 | 48 | (France) IDEC Sport | (France) Paul-Loup Chatin (Germany) Laurents Hörr (France) Paul Lafargue | Gibson GK428 4.2 L V8 | G | 327 | +15 laps |
| 15 | LMP2 | 10 | (United Kingdom) Vector Sport | (France) Gabriel Aubry (Republic of Ireland) Ryan Cullen (Liechtenstein) Matthias Kaiser | Oreca 07 | G | 325 | +17 laps |
| 15 | LMP2 | 10 | (United Kingdom) Vector Sport | (France) Gabriel Aubry (Republic of Ireland) Ryan Cullen (Liechtenstein) Matthias Kaiser | Gibson GK428 4.2 L V8 | G | 325 | +17 laps |
| 16 | Hypercar | 5 | (Germany) Porsche Penske Motorsport | (United States) Dane Cameron (Denmark) Michael Christensen (France) Frédéric Makowiecki | Porsche 963 | M | 325 (Note: The No. 5 Porsche Penske Motorsport entry was initially classified ninth but was penalized four laps for failing to meet the maximum lap time for their final lap of the race.) | +17 laps |
| 16 | Hypercar | 5 | (Germany) Porsche Penske Motorsport | (United States) Dane Cameron (Denmark) Michael Christensen (France) Frédéric Makowiecki | Porsche 9RD 4.6 L Turbo V8 | M | 325 | +17 laps |
| 17 | Hypercar | 311 | (United States) Action Express Racing | (United Kingdom) Jack Aitken (Brazil) Pipo Derani (United Kingdom) Alexander Sims | Cadillac V-Series.R | M | 324 | +18 laps |
| 17 | Hypercar | 311 | (United States) Action Express Racing | (United Kingdom) Jack Aitken (Brazil) Pipo Derani (United Kingdom) Alexander Sims | Cadillac LMC55R 5.5 L V8 | M | 324 | +18 laps |
| 18 | LMP2 | 23 | (United Kingdom) United Autosports | (United Kingdom) Tom Blomqvist (United Kingdom) Oliver Jarvis (United States) Josh Pierson | Oreca 07 | G | 323 | +19 laps |
| 18 | LMP2 | 23 | (United Kingdom) United Autosports | (United Kingdom) Tom Blomqvist (United Kingdom) Oliver Jarvis (United States) Josh Pierson | Gibson GK428 4.2 L V8 | G | 323 | +19 laps |
| 19 | LMP2 | 35 | (France) Alpine Elf Team | (United Kingdom) Olli Caldwell (Brazil) André Negrão (Mexico) Memo Rojas | Oreca 07 | G | 322 | +20 laps |
| 19 | LMP2 | 35 | (France) Alpine Elf Team | (United Kingdom) Olli Caldwell (Brazil) André Negrão (Mexico) Memo Rojas | Gibson GK428 4.2 L V8 | G | 322 | +20 laps |
| 20 | **LMP2 (Pro-Am)** | **45** | **(Portugal) Algarve Pro Racing** | **(Australia) James Allen (United States) Colin Braun (United States) George Kurtz** | **Oreca 07** | G | **322** | **+20 laps‡** |
| 20 | **LMP2 (Pro-Am)** | **45** | **(Portugal) Algarve Pro Racing** | **(Australia) James Allen (United States) Colin Braun (United States) George Kurtz** | **Gibson GK428 4.2 L V8** | G | **322** | **+20 laps‡** |
| 21 | LMP2 | 22 | (United Kingdom) United Autosports | (Portugal) Filipe Albuquerque (United Kingdom) Phil Hanson (United Kingdom) Frederick Lubin | Oreca 07 | G | 321 | +21 laps |
| 21 | LMP2 | 22 | (United Kingdom) United Autosports | (Portugal) Filipe Albuquerque (United Kingdom) Phil Hanson (United Kingdom) Frederick Lubin | Gibson GK428 4.2 L V8 | G | 321 | +21 laps |
| 22 | Hypercar | 6 | (Germany) Porsche Penske Motorsport | (France) Kévin Estre (Germany) André Lotterer (Belgium) Laurens Vanthoor | Porsche 963 | M | 320 | +22 laps |
| 22 | Hypercar | 6 | (Germany) Porsche Penske Motorsport | (France) Kévin Estre (Germany) André Lotterer (Belgium) Laurens Vanthoor | Porsche 9RD 4.6 L Turbo V8 | M | 320 | +22 laps |
| 23 | LMP2 (Pro-Am) | 37 | (Switzerland) Cool Racing | (Switzerland) Alexandre Coigny (Denmark) Malthe Jakobsen (France) Nicolas Lapierre | Oreca 07 | G | 317 | +25 laps |
| 23 | LMP2 (Pro-Am) | 37 | (Switzerland) Cool Racing | (Switzerland) Alexandre Coigny (Denmark) Malthe Jakobsen (France) Nicolas Lapierre | Gibson GK428 4.2 L V8 | G | 317 | +25 laps |
| 24 | LMP2 | 28 | (United Kingdom) Jota | (Brazil) Pietro Fittipaldi (Denmark) David Heinemeier Hansson (Denmark) Oliver Rasmussen | Oreca 07 | G | 316 | +26 laps |
| 24 | LMP2 | 28 | (United Kingdom) Jota | (Brazil) Pietro Fittipaldi (Denmark) David Heinemeier Hansson (Denmark) Oliver Rasmussen | Gibson GK428 4.2 L V8 | G | 316 | +26 laps |
| 25 | LMP2 | 65 | (France) Panis Racing | (Netherlands) Tijmen van der Helm (Venezuela) Manuel Maldonado (Netherlands) Job van Uitert | Oreca 07 | G | 316 | +26 laps |
| 25 | LMP2 | 65 | (France) Panis Racing | (Netherlands) Tijmen van der Helm (Venezuela) Manuel Maldonado (Netherlands) Job van Uitert | Gibson GK428 4.2 L V8 | G | 316 | +26 laps |
| 26 | **LMGTE Am** | **33** | **(United States) Corvette Racing** | **(Netherlands) Nicky Catsburg (United States) Ben Keating (Argentina) Nicolás Varrone** | **Chevrolet Corvette C8.R** | M | **313** | **+29 laps‡** |
| 26 | **LMGTE Am** | **33** | **(United States) Corvette Racing** | **(Netherlands) Nicky Catsburg (United States) Ben Keating (Argentina) Nicolás Varrone** | **Chevrolet LT2 5.5 L V8** | M | **313** | **+29 laps‡** |
| 27 | Hypercar | 94 | (France) Peugeot TotalEnergies | (France) Loïc Duval (United States) Gustavo Menezes (Switzerland) Nico Müller | Peugeot 9X8 | M | 312 | +30 laps |
| 27 | Hypercar | 94 | (France) Peugeot TotalEnergies | (France) Loïc Duval (United States) Gustavo Menezes (Switzerland) Nico Müller | Peugeot X6H 2.6 L Turbo V6 | M | 312 | +30 laps |
| 28 | LMGTE Am | 25 | (Oman) ORT by TF | (Oman) Ahmad Al Harthy (United States) Michael Dinan (Republic of Ireland) Charlie Eastwood | Aston Martin Vantage AMR | M | 312 | +30 laps |
| 28 | LMGTE Am | 25 | (Oman) ORT by TF | (Oman) Ahmad Al Harthy (United States) Michael Dinan (Republic of Ireland) Charlie Eastwood | Aston Martin M177 4.0 L Turbo V8 | M | 312 | +30 laps |
| 29 | LMGTE Am | 86 | (United Kingdom) GR Racing | (United Kingdom) Ben Barker (Italy) Riccardo Pera (United Kingdom) Michael Wainwright | Porsche 911 RSR-19 | M | 312 | +30 laps |
| 29 | LMGTE Am | 86 | (United Kingdom) GR Racing | (United Kingdom) Ben Barker (Italy) Riccardo Pera (United Kingdom) Michael Wainwright | Porsche M97/80 4.2 L Flat-6 | M | 312 | +30 laps |
| 30 | LMGTE Am | 85 | (Italy) Iron Dames | (Belgium) Sarah Bovy (Switzerland) Rahel Frey (Denmark) Michelle Gatting | Porsche 911 RSR-19 | M | 312 | +30 laps |
| 30 | LMGTE Am | 85 | (Italy) Iron Dames | (Belgium) Sarah Bovy (Switzerland) Rahel Frey (Denmark) Michelle Gatting | Porsche M97/80 4.2 L Flat-6 | M | 312 | +30 laps |
| 31 | LMGTE Am | 54 | (Italy) AF Corse | (Italy) Francesco Castellacci (Switzerland) Thomas Flohr (Italy) Davide Rigon | Ferrari 488 GTE Evo | M | 312 | +30 laps |
| 31 | LMGTE Am | 54 | (Italy) AF Corse | (Italy) Francesco Castellacci (Switzerland) Thomas Flohr (Italy) Davide Rigon | Ferrari F154CB 3.9 L Turbo V8 | M | 312 | +30 laps |
| 32 | LMP2 (Pro-Am) | 43 | (Luxembourg) DKR Engineering | (Belgium) Maxime Martin (Belgium) Tom Van Rompuy (Belgium) Ugo de Wilde | Oreca 07 | G | 311 | +31 laps |
| 32 | LMP2 (Pro-Am) | 43 | (Luxembourg) DKR Engineering | (Belgium) Maxime Martin (Belgium) Tom Van Rompuy (Belgium) Ugo de Wilde | Gibson GK428 4.2 L V8 | G | 311 | +31 laps |
| 33 | LMGTE Am | 98 | (Canada) NorthWest AMR | (United Kingdom) Ian James (Italy) Daniel Mancinelli (Spain) Alex Riberas | Aston Martin Vantage AMR | M | 310 | +32 laps |
| 33 | LMGTE Am | 98 | (Canada) NorthWest AMR | (United Kingdom) Ian James (Italy) Daniel Mancinelli (Spain) Alex Riberas | Aston Martin M177 4.0 L Turbo V8 | M | 310 | +32 laps |
| 34 | LMP2 | 9 | (Italy) Prema Racing | (United States) Juan Manuel Correa (Romania) Filip Ugran (Netherlands) Bent Viscaal | Oreca 07 | G | 310 | +32 laps |
| 34 | LMP2 | 9 | (Italy) Prema Racing | (United States) Juan Manuel Correa (Romania) Filip Ugran (Netherlands) Bent Viscaal | Gibson GK428 4.2 L V8 | G | 310 | +32 laps |
| 35 | LMGTE Am | 56 | (Germany) Project 1 – AO | (Italy) Matteo Cairoli (United States) P. J. Hyett (United States) Gunnar Jeannette | Porsche 911 RSR-19 | M | 309 | +33 laps |
| 35 | LMGTE Am | 56 | (Germany) Project 1 – AO | (Italy) Matteo Cairoli (United States) P. J. Hyett (United States) Gunnar Jeannette | Porsche M97/80 4.2 L Flat-6 | M | 309 | +33 laps |
| 36 | LMGTE Am | 100 | (Germany) Walkenhorst Motorsport | (Indonesia) Andrew Haryanto (United States) Chandler Hull (United States) Jeff Segal | Ferrari 488 GTE Evo | M | 307 | +35 laps |
| 36 | LMGTE Am | 100 | (Germany) Walkenhorst Motorsport | (Indonesia) Andrew Haryanto (United States) Chandler Hull (United States) Jeff Segal | Ferrari F154CB 3.9 L Turbo V8 | M | 307 | +35 laps |
| 37 | LMP2 (Pro-Am) | 39 | (France) Graff Racing | (Netherlands) Giedo van der Garde (Italy) Roberto Lacorte (France) Patrick Pilet | Oreca 07 | G | 303 | +39 laps |
| 37 | LMP2 (Pro-Am) | 39 | (France) Graff Racing | (Netherlands) Giedo van der Garde (Italy) Roberto Lacorte (France) Patrick Pilet | Gibson GK428 4.2 L V8 | G | 303 | +39 laps |
| 38 | LMGTE Am | 74 | (Switzerland) Kessel Racing | (Japan) Kei Cozzolino (Japan) Yorikatsu Tsujiko (Japan) Naoki Yokomizo | Ferrari 488 GTE Evo | M | 303 | +39 laps |
| 38 | LMGTE Am | 74 | (Switzerland) Kessel Racing | (Japan) Kei Cozzolino (Japan) Yorikatsu Tsujiko (Japan) Naoki Yokomizo | Ferrari F154CB 3.9 L Turbo V8 | M | 303 | +39 laps |
| 39 | Innovative | 24 | (United States) Hendrick Motorsports | (United Kingdom) Jenson Button (United States) Jimmie Johnson (Germany) Mike Rockenfeller | Chevrolet Camaro ZL1 | G | 285 | +57 laps |
| 39 | Innovative | 24 | (United States) Hendrick Motorsports | (United Kingdom) Jenson Button (United States) Jimmie Johnson (Germany) Mike Rockenfeller | Chevrolet R07.2 5.9 L V8 | G | 285 | +57 laps |
| 40 | Hypercar | 38 | (United Kingdom) Hertz Team Jota | (Portugal) António Félix da Costa (United Kingdom) Will Stevens (China) Yifei Ye | Porsche 963 | M | 244 | +98 laps |
| 40 | Hypercar | 38 | (United Kingdom) Hertz Team Jota | (Portugal) António Félix da Costa (United Kingdom) Will Stevens (China) Yifei Ye | Porsche 9RD 4.6 L Turbo V8 | M | 244 | +98 laps |
| DNF | LMGTE Am | 57 | (Switzerland) Kessel Racing | (United States) Scott Huffaker (Japan) Takeshi Kimura (Brazil) Daniel Serra | Ferrari 488 GTE Evo | M | 254 | Accident |
| DNF | LMGTE Am | 57 | (Switzerland) Kessel Racing | (United States) Scott Huffaker (Japan) Takeshi Kimura (Brazil) Daniel Serra | Ferrari F154CB 3.9 L Turbo V8 | M | 254 | Accident |
| DNF | LMGTE Am | 911 | (Germany) Proton Competition | (Republic of Ireland) Michael Fassbender (Austria) Richard Lietz (Estonia) Martin Rump | Porsche 911 RSR-19 | M | 246 | Accident damage |
| DNF | LMGTE Am | 911 | (Germany) Proton Competition | (Republic of Ireland) Michael Fassbender (Austria) Richard Lietz (Estonia) Martin Rump | Porsche M97/80 4.2 L Flat-6 | M | 246 | Accident damage |
| DNF | LMP2 (Pro-Am) | 80 | (Italy) AF Corse | (United Kingdom) Ben Barnicoat (France) Norman Nato (France) François Perrodo | Oreca 07 | G | 183 | Accident |
| DNF | LMP2 (Pro-Am) | 80 | (Italy) AF Corse | (United Kingdom) Ben Barnicoat (France) Norman Nato (France) François Perrodo | Gibson GK428 4.2 L V8 | G | 183 | Accident |
| DNF | LMGTE Am | 88 | (Germany) Proton Competition | (Germany) Jonas Ried (United Kingdom) Harry Tincknell (United States) Don Yount | Porsche 911 RSR-19 | M | 170 | Accident |
| DNF | LMGTE Am | 88 | (Germany) Proton Competition | (Germany) Jonas Ried (United Kingdom) Harry Tincknell (United States) Don Yount | Porsche M97/80 4.2 L Flat-6 | M | 170 | Accident |
| DNF | Hypercar | 4 | (Austria) Floyd Vanwall Racing Team | (France) Tom Dillmann (Argentina) Esteban Guerrieri (France) Tristan Vautier | Vanwall Vandervell 680 | M | 165 | Engine |
| DNF | Hypercar | 4 | (Austria) Floyd Vanwall Racing Team | (France) Tom Dillmann (Argentina) Esteban Guerrieri (France) Tristan Vautier | Gibson GL458 4.5 L V8 | M | 165 | Engine |
| DNF | LMGTE Am | 777 | (Japan) D'station Racing | (Japan) Tomonobu Fujii (Japan) Satoshi Hoshino (United Kingdom) Casper Stevenson | Aston Martin Vantage AMR | M | 163 | Electrical |
| DNF | LMGTE Am | 777 | (Japan) D'station Racing | (Japan) Tomonobu Fujii (Japan) Satoshi Hoshino (United Kingdom) Casper Stevenson | Aston Martin M177 4.0 L Turbo V8 | M | 163 | Electrical |
| DNF | LMP2 | 47 | (Switzerland) Cool Racing | (France) Reshad de Gerus; Vladislav Lomko (Note: Kvyat and Lomko are Russian but compete as neutral competitors as Russian national emblems were banned by the Fédération Internationale de l'Automobile due to the Russian invasion of Ukraine.) (France) Simon Pagenaud | Oreca 07 | G | 158 | Accident |
| DNF | LMP2 | 47 | (Switzerland) Cool Racing | (France) Reshad de Gerus; Vladislav Lomko (France) Simon Pagenaud | Gibson GK428 4.2 L V8 | G | 158 | Accident |
| DNF | LMGTE Am | 77 | (Germany) Dempsey – Proton Racing | (France) Julien Andlauer (Germany) Christian Ried (Denmark) Mikkel O. Pedersen | Porsche 911 RSR-19 | M | 118 | Accident damage |
| DNF | LMGTE Am | 77 | (Germany) Dempsey – Proton Racing | (France) Julien Andlauer (Germany) Christian Ried (Denmark) Mikkel O. Pedersen | Porsche M97/80 4.2 L Flat-6 | M | 118 | Accident damage |
| DNF | LMP2 (Pro-Am) | 32 | (Poland) Inter Europol Competition | (Denmark) Anders Fjordbach (United States) Mark Kvamme (Denmark) Jan Magnussen | Oreca 07 | G | 117 | Suspension |
| DNF | LMP2 (Pro-Am) | 32 | (Poland) Inter Europol Competition | (Denmark) Anders Fjordbach (United States) Mark Kvamme (Denmark) Jan Magnussen | Gibson GK428 4.2 L V8 | G | 117 | Suspension |
| DNF | LMP2 | 63 | (Italy) Prema Racing | (Italy) Mirko Bortolotti; Daniil Kvyat (France) Doriane Pin | Oreca 07 | G | 113 | Accident |
| DNF | LMP2 | 63 | (Italy) Prema Racing | (Italy) Mirko Bortolotti; Daniil Kvyat (France) Doriane Pin | Gibson GK428 4.2 L V8 | G | 113 | Accident |
| DNF | Hypercar | 7 | (Japan) Toyota Gazoo Racing | (United Kingdom) Mike Conway (Japan) Kamui Kobayashi (Argentina) José María López | Toyota GR010 Hybrid | M | 103 | Collision |
| DNF | Hypercar | 7 | (Japan) Toyota Gazoo Racing | (United Kingdom) Mike Conway (Japan) Kamui Kobayashi (Argentina) José María López | Toyota H8909 3.5 L Turbo V6 | M | 103 | Collision |
| DNF | LMGTE Am | 66 | (United Kingdom) JMW Motorsport | (France) Thomas Neubauer (Italy) Giacomo Petrobelli (Monaco) Louis Prette | Ferrari 488 GTE Evo | M | 89 | Collision |
| DNF | LMGTE Am | 66 | (United Kingdom) JMW Motorsport | (France) Thomas Neubauer (Italy) Giacomo Petrobelli (Monaco) Louis Prette | Ferrari F154CB 3.9 L Turbo V8 | M | 89 | Collision |
| DNF | LMP2 (Pro-Am) | 923 | Racing Team Turkey | (United Kingdom) Tom Gamble (Belgium) Dries Vanthoor (Turkey) Salih Yoluç | Oreca 07 | G | 87 | Suspension |
| DNF | LMP2 (Pro-Am) | 923 | Racing Team Turkey | (United Kingdom) Tom Gamble (Belgium) Dries Vanthoor (Turkey) Salih Yoluç | Gibson GK428 4.2 L V8 | G | 87 | Suspension |
| DNF | Hypercar | 75 | (Germany) Porsche Penske Motorsport | (France) Mathieu Jaminet (Brazil) Felipe Nasr (United Kingdom) Nick Tandy | Porsche 963 | M | 84 | Fuel pressure |
| DNF | Hypercar | 75 | (Germany) Porsche Penske Motorsport | (France) Mathieu Jaminet (Brazil) Felipe Nasr (United Kingdom) Nick Tandy | Porsche 9RD 4.6 L Turbo V8 | M | 84 | Fuel pressure |
| DNF | LMGTE Am | 72 | (United Kingdom) TF Sport | (France) Valentin Hasse-Clot (France) Arnold Robin (France) Maxime Robin | Aston Martin Vantage AMR | M | 58 | Accident |
| DNF | LMGTE Am | 72 | (United Kingdom) TF Sport | (France) Valentin Hasse-Clot (France) Arnold Robin (France) Maxime Robin | Aston Martin M177 4.0 L Turbo V8 | M | 58 | Accident |
| DNF | LMGTE Am | 83 | (Italy) Richard Mille AF Corse | (Argentina) Luis Pérez Companc (Italy) Alessio Rovera (France) Lilou Wadoux | Ferrari 488 GTE Evo | M | 33 | Accident |
| DNF | LMGTE Am | 83 | (Italy) Richard Mille AF Corse | (Argentina) Luis Pérez Companc (Italy) Alessio Rovera (France) Lilou Wadoux | Ferrari F154CB 3.9 L Turbo V8 | M | 33 | Accident |
| DNF | LMGTE Am | 60 | (Italy) Iron Lynx | (Italy) Matteo Cressoni (Belgium) Alessio Picariello (Italy) Claudio Schiavoni | Porsche 911 RSR-19 | M | 28 | Collision |
| DNF | LMGTE Am | 60 | (Italy) Iron Lynx | (Italy) Matteo Cressoni (Belgium) Alessio Picariello (Italy) Claudio Schiavoni | Porsche M97/80 4.2 L Flat-6 | M | 28 | Collision |
| DNF | LMGTE Am | 16 | (Germany) Proton Competition | (United States) Ryan Hardwick (Belgium) Jan Heylen (Canada) Zacharie Robichon | Porsche 911 RSR-19 | M | 28 | Collision |
| DNF | LMGTE Am | 16 | (Germany) Proton Competition | (United States) Ryan Hardwick (Belgium) Jan Heylen (Canada) Zacharie Robichon | Porsche M97/80 4.2 L Flat-6 | M | 28 | Collision |
| DNF | LMGTE Am | 55 | (Denmark) GMB Motorsport | (Denmark) Gustav Birch (Denmark) Jens Reno Møller (Denmark) Marco Sørensen | Aston Martin Vantage AMR | M | 21 | Collision |
| DNF | LMGTE Am | 55 | (Denmark) GMB Motorsport | (Denmark) Gustav Birch (Denmark) Jens Reno Møller (Denmark) Marco Sørensen | Aston Martin M177 4.0 L Turbo V8 | M | 21 | Collision |
| DNF | LMGTE Am | 21 | (Italy) AF Corse | (United States) Simon Mann (Belgium) Ulysse de Pauw (France) Julien Piguet | Ferrari 488 GTE Evo | M | 21 | Collision |
| DNF | LMGTE Am | 21 | (Italy) AF Corse | (United States) Simon Mann (Belgium) Ulysse de Pauw (France) Julien Piguet | Ferrari F154CB 3.9 L Turbo V8 | M | 21 | Collision |
| DNF | LMP2 (Pro-Am) | 13 | (Canada) Tower Motorsports | (Germany) René Rast (United States) Ricky Taylor (United States) Steven Thomas | Oreca 07 | G | 19 | Accident |
| DNF | LMP2 (Pro-Am) | 13 | (Canada) Tower Motorsports | (Germany) René Rast (United States) Ricky Taylor (United States) Steven Thomas | Gibson GK428 4.2 L V8 | G | 19 | Accident |
| DNF | LMP2 (Pro-Am) | 14 | (United Kingdom) Nielsen Racing | (Switzerland) Mathias Beche (United Kingdom) Ben Hanley (United States) Rodrigo Sales | Oreca 07 | G | 18 | Accident |
| DNF | LMP2 (Pro-Am) | 14 | (United Kingdom) Nielsen Racing | (Switzerland) Mathias Beche (United Kingdom) Ben Hanley (United States) Rodrigo Sales | Gibson GK428 4.2 L V8 | G | 18 | Accident |

Tyre manufacturers
Key
| Symbol | Tyre manufacturer |
|---|---|
| **G** | Goodyear |
| **M** | Michelin |

== Championship standings after the race ==
- Only the top five positions are included for all championship standings.

2023 Hypercar World Endurance Drivers' Championship
| Pos | +/- | Driver | Points |
|---|---|---|---|
| 1 | | (Switzerland) Sébastien Buemi (New Zealand) Brendon Hartley (Japan) Ryō Hirakawa | 107 |
| 2 | 3 | (United Kingdom) James Calado (Italy) Antonio Giovinazzi (Italy) Alessandro Pier Guidi | 82 |
| 3 | 1 | (New Zealand) Earl Bamber (United Kingdom) Alex Lynn (United Kingdom) Richard Westbrook | 70 |
| 4 | 1 | (Italy) Antonio Fuoco (Spain) Miguel Molina (Denmark) Nicklas Nielsen | 67 |
| 5 | 3 | (United Kingdom) Mike Conway (Japan) Kamui Kobayashi (Argentina) José María López | 66 |

2023 Hypercar World Endurance Manufacturers' Championship
| Pos | +/- | Manufacturer | Points |
|---|---|---|---|
| 1 | | (Japan) Toyota | 126 |
| 2 | | (Italy) Ferrari | 107 |
| 3 | 1 | (United States) Cadillac | 70 |
| 4 | 1 | (Germany) Porsche | 54 |
| 5 | | (France) Peugeot | 35 |

2023 FIA Endurance Trophy for Hypercar Teams
| Pos | +/- | No. | Team | Points |
|---|---|---|---|---|
| 1 | | 38 | (United Kingdom) Hertz Team Jota | 75 |

2023 FIA Endurance Trophy for LMP2 Drivers
| Pos | +/- | Drivers | Points |
|---|---|---|---|
| 1 | 1 | (Angola) Rui Andrade (Switzerland) Louis Delétraz (Poland) Robert Kubica | 94 |
| 2 | 4 | (Spain) Albert Costa (Switzerland) Fabio Scherer (Poland) Jakub Śmiechowski | 90 |
| 3 | 2 | (United Kingdom) Phil Hanson (United Kingdom) Frederick Lubin | 74 |
| 4 | | (United Kingdom) Oliver Jarvis (United States) Josh Pierson | 61 |
| 5 | 2 | (Portugal) Filipe Albuquerque | 56 |

2023 FIA Endurance Trophy for LMP2 Teams
| Pos | +/- | No. | Team | Points |
|---|---|---|---|---|
| 1 | 1 | 41 | (Belgium) Team WRT | 94 |
| 2 | 3 | 34 | (Poland) Inter Europol Competition | 90 |
| 3 | 2 | 22 | (United Kingdom) United Autosports | 74 |
| 4 | 1 | 23 | (United Kingdom) United Autosports | 61 |
| 5 | 2 | 31 | (Belgium) Team WRT | 52 |

2023 FIA Endurance Trophy for LMGTE Am Drivers
| Pos | +/- | Drivers | Points |
|---|---|---|---|
| 1 | | (Netherlands) Nicky Catsburg (United States) Ben Keating (Argentina) Nicolás Varrone | 133 |
| 2 | 6 | (Oman) Ahmad Al Harthy (United States) Michael Dinan (Republic of Ireland) Charlie Eastwood | 59 |
| 3 | 2 | (Belgium) Sarah Bovy (Switzerland) Rahel Frey (Denmark) Michelle Gatting | 56 |
| 4 | 3 | (Italy) Francesco Castellacci (Switzerland) Thomas Flohr (Italy) Davide Rigon | 47 |
| 5 | 3 | (Argentina) Luis Pérez Companc (Italy) Alessio Rovera (France) Lilou Wadoux | 43 |

2023 FIA Endurance Trophy for LMGTE Am Teams
| Pos | +/- | No. | Team | Points |
|---|---|---|---|---|
| 1 | | 33 | (United States) Corvette Racing | 133 |
| 2 | 6 | 25 | (Oman) ORT by TF | 59 |
| 3 | 2 | 85 | (Italy) Iron Dames | 56 |
| 4 | 3 | 54 | (Italy) AF Corse | 47 |
| 5 | 2 | 83 | (Italy) Richard Mille AF Corse | 43 |

== Notes ==
FIA World Endurance Championship
| Previous race: 6 Hours of Spa-Francorchamps | 2023 season | Next race: 6 Hours of Monza |
