= Princess Nina of Greece and Denmark =

Swiss businesswoman, socialite, and member of the Danish and Greek royal families

Princess Nina
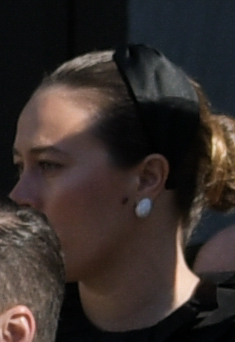
- Princess Nina at the funeral of Constantine II in 2023
- Born: Nina Nastassja Flohr; 22 January 1987 (age 39); St. Moritz, Switzerland
- Spouse: Prince Philippos of Greece and Denmark (m. 2020)
- Issue: Prince Kimon
- House: Glücksburg (by marriage)
- Father: Thomas Flohr
- Mother: Katharina Konečný
- Occupation: Businesswoman

Princess Nina of Greece and Denmark (née Nina Nastassja Flohr; born 22 January 1987) is a Swiss businesswoman, heiress and socialite. She is a member of the non-reigning Greek royal family and a member of the extended Danish royal family as the wife of Prince Philippos of Greece and Denmark, son of Constantine II of Greece and Anne-Marie of Denmark. She is the founder and creative director of the Kisawa Sanctuary and the founder of the Bazaruto Center for Scientific Studies. She previously worked as the creative director of VistaJet, a luxury private airline company founded by her father Thomas Flohr.

== Early life ==
Princess Nina was born Nina Nastassja Flohr on 22 January 1987 in St. Moritz, Switzerland, to Thomas Flohr, a Swiss billionaire and founder of VistaJet, and Katharina Konečný, the creative director of the House of Fabergé and a founding editor of Vogue Russia and Vogue Greece. She has a half sister named Sophia, on her mother's side. Flohr was educated in the United Kingdom and the United States.

Her parents divorced when she was five years old and, in 2001, she moved to London, where her mother accepted a position as the jewelry editor at Tatler.

== Career ==
In 2012, Flohr was featured in a Fabergé advertisement campaign.

=== Vista Jet ===
Flohr worked as the creative director of VistaJet, a private jet company founded by her father, until 2016. She collaborated with Moncler on cabin crew uniforms and worked with Nobu Matsuhisa to create deluxe menus for airplanes. Flohr also introduced an organic skincare and cosmetics line, toiletries from California, bespoke Italian linens, and duck-down duvets for the airline. She also partnered with Heywood Hill to provide books for the airline. As a branding concept, Flohr had $45 million Bombardier jets' tail fins painted with graffiti.

=== Kisawa Sancturay ===
She is the founder and creative director of the Kisawa Sanctuary, an island luxury resort hotel, exclusively located on Benguerra Island in Mozambique. She founded the sanctuary and the attached Bazaruto conservation center in 2017 as a way to combine tourism and environmental concerns in Mozambique, where most of the national economy is built on the oil and gas industries. Kisawa is the world's first 3D-printed resort, having been created using a 3D printer with sand-and-sea-water mortar. The sanctuary includes a standalone spa, called the Natural Wellness Center, which specializes in traditional Chinese medicine and ayurvedic offerings. Flohr also had tennis courts, a gym, a yoga and meditation pavilion, four dining venues, twelve bungalows, a swimming pool, massage hut, and a water sports facility built on the property. The conservation center has a field marine station and laboratory focused on maintenance of local wildlife, including birds, turtles, whales, and sharks.

== Personal life ==
Flohr has been considered part of the European jet set, and is close friends with Bianca Brandolini d'Adda, Allegra Versace, and Margherita Missoni. She lives in Notting Hill, London and in California.

She met Prince Philippos of Greece and Denmark, the youngest child of Constantine II of Greece and Anne-Marie of Denmark and a godson of Diana, Princess of Wales, in 2018. That same year, they appeared together at the wedding of Princess Eugenie of York and Jack Brooksbank. They made other official appearances as a couple, including the wedding of Lord Edward Spencer-Churchill and Kimberly Hammerstroem in 2018 and the wedding of Jean-Christophe, Prince Napoléon and Countess Olympia von und zu Arco-Zinneberg in 2019. In 2020 while vacationing in Ithaca, Greece, Flohr and Prince Philippos became engaged. The engagement was officially announced by the non-reigning Greek royal family's press office on 1 September 2020. They were married civilly on 12 December 2020 in a private ceremony in St. Moritz, Switzerland. Due to the COVID-19 pandemic in Switzerland, the only guests at the wedding were the couple's fathers. In June 2020, they had a wedding party at Stibbington House, the Cambridge home of Thomas Philip Naylor-Leyland and Alice Naylor-Leyland. A Greek Orthodox ceremony took place on 23 October 2021 at the Metropolitan Cathedral of Athens. The ceremony was attended by members of the former Greek royal family and Queen Sofía of Spain, Infanta Elena, Duchess of Lugo, Princess Tatiana Radziwiłł, Princess Benedikte of Denmark, Princess Beatrice and Edoardo Mapelli Mozzi and Princess Eugenie and Jack Brooksbank.

Princess Nina and her husband have a son, Prince Kimon Thomas Konstantinos of Greece and Denmark, who was born via a surrogate on 27 July 2026 in the United States.

== Titles and styles ==
- 12 December 2020 – present: Her Royal Highness Princess Nina of Greece and Denmark

With the 1974 Greek republic referendum and Article 4 of the Constitution of Greece, all family members have been stripped of their honorific titles and the associated royal status. Many family members born after 1974 still use the titles "Prince of Greece" and "Princess of Greece" to describe themselves, but such descriptions are neither conferred nor legally recognised by the Greek state as royal or noble titles. The family accepts that these terms are not royal titles, but rather personal identifiers. As a wife of a Prince of Denmark, she is entitled to the title Princess of Denmark with the style Highness.

== Honours ==
=== Dynastic orders ===
- (Greece) Greek Royal Family:
  - Dame Grand Cross of the Order of Saints Olga and Sophia
