= Robert Konieczny =

Polish architect (born 1969)

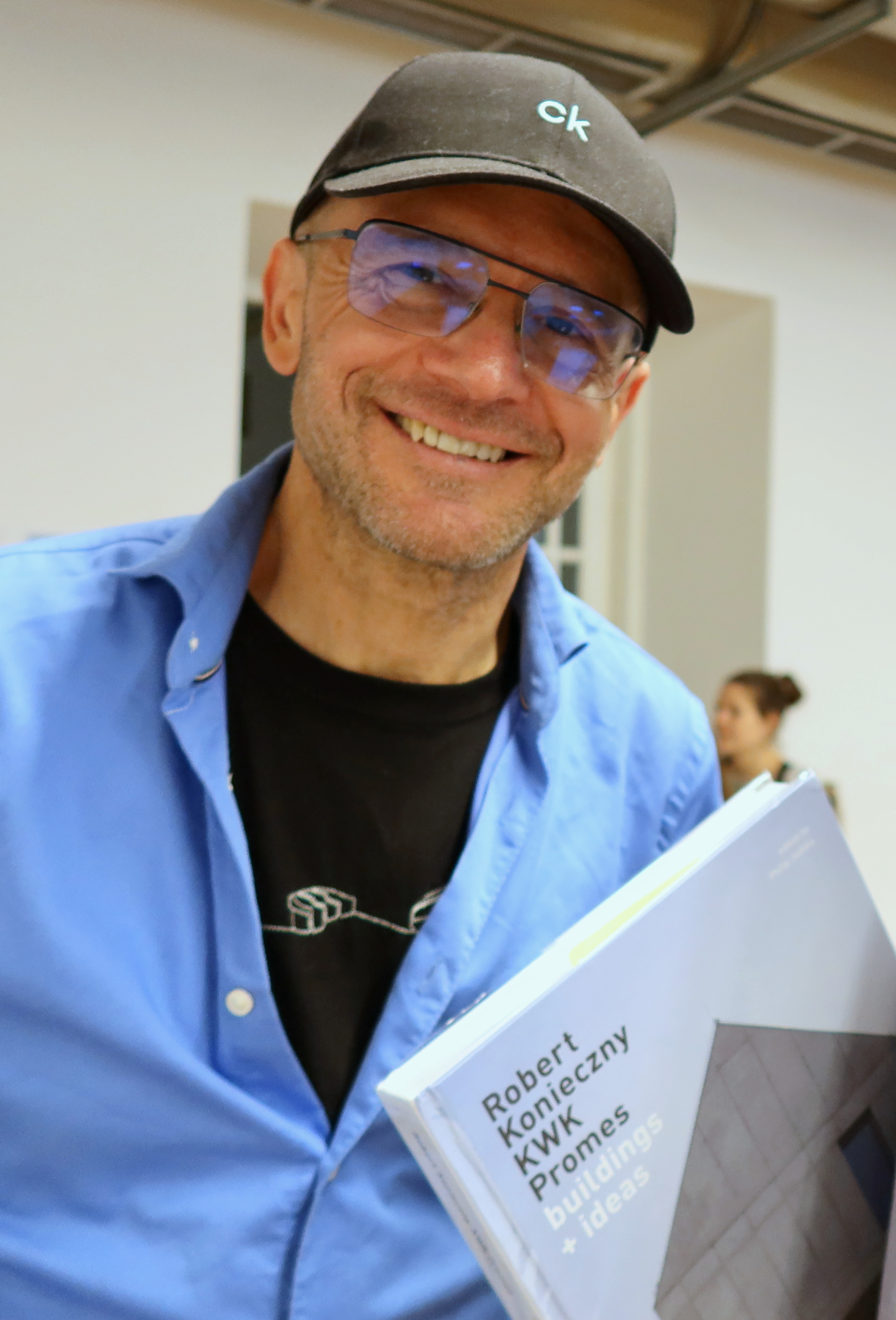
- Konieczny in 2025
- Born: December 4, 1969 (age 56); Katowice, Poland
- Education: Silesian University of Technology
- Occupation: Architect
- Website: www.kwkpromes.pl

Robert Konieczny (pronounced: [kɔˈɲɛt͡ʂnɨ]; born 4 December 1969 in Katowice) is a Polish architect. He is the founder and CEO of KWK Promes, an architecture studio based in Katowice. Konieczny is the designer of The Dialogue Centre Upheavals in National Museum of Szczecin which was awarded as The Best Public Space in Europe at European Prize for Urban Public Space organized by Centre de Cultura Contemporània de Barcelona. The project also was named as the World Building of the Year by World Architecture Festival, in 2016. Konieczny also is a member of Académie d'architecture.

== Career ==
Konieczny graduated from Silesian University of Technology with a bachelor's degree in architecture. In 1996, he received the certificate of New Jersey Institute of Technology. In 1999, he founded the KWK Promes architecture studio. Together with the studio, he has received numerous awards and nominations. Konieczny was nominated to the European Union Prize for Contemporary Architecture of the Mies van der Rohe Foundation ten times.

In 2024, Images Publishing released an English-language monograph titled Robert Konieczny KWK Promes. Buildings + ideas by Philip Jodido.

== Personal life ==
He was born to father Stanisław Konieczny and mother Elwira (née Frigerio). Due to her mother's Italian descent, he also holds an Italian citizenship. He is married to wife Patrycja and has a daughter Lena. He lives in Katowice and Brenna.

== Awards and recognition ==
His selected awards include:

- 2021: Iconic Award for the Quadrant House
- 2020: German Design Award for UNIKATO
- 2019: Architizer A+Award for Quadrant House
- 2018: German Design Award for By the Way House
- 2017: International Architecture Award by The Chicago Athenaeum for Konieczny's Ark
- 2017: Best New Private House in worldwide competition Wallpaper Design Awards for Konieczny's Ark
- 2016: European Prize for Urban Public Space for Museum Dialogue Center Przełomy
- 2016: World Building of the Year in World Architecture Festival Berlinfor Museum Dialogue Center Przełomy
- 2011: Minister of Culture and National Heritage Lifetime Achievement Award.
- 2008: Was named as one of 'Europe 40 under 40' by Chicago Athenaeum
- 2008: International Architecture Award by Chicago Athenaeum for Aatrial House and Hidden House
- 2007: 44 Best Young International Architects Robert Konieczny KWK Promes by SCALAE magazine
- 2006: House of the Year Award in World Architecture News for Aatrial House

== Selected projects ==
- Contemporary Art Gallery PLATO, Ostrava (2022)
- Miedzianka Shaft, Miedzianka (2022)
- Haven, Biały Bór (2021)
- From the Garden House, Laka (2021)
- Quadrant House, Warsaw (2019)
- UNIKATO, Katowice (2018)
- By the Way House, Poland (2017)
- Contemporary Art Gallery Bunkier Sztuki, Kraków (2016)
- Triangular House, Vilnius (2016)
- National Museum Dialogue Center Przełomy, Szczecin (2016)
- Konieczny's Ark, Brenna (2015)
- Living-Garden House, Katowice (2013)
- Autofamily House, Poland (2012)
- Standard House, Pszczyna (2011)
- Safe House, Warsaw (2008)
- Outrial House, Książenice (2007)
- Aatrial House, Opole (2007)
- Broken House, Katowice (2002)
