= Skonieczny =

Skonieczny (masculine), Skonieczna (feminine) is a Polish surname. A possible origin is a nickname for a person who lived at the edge of a village, from the archaic meaning of the word konieczny, 'last'. Variants: Koneczny, Konyeczny, Skoneczny. Notable persons with the name include:

- Czesław Skonieczny
- Gertruda Skonieczna, birth name of Gertruda Biernat
- Krzysztof Skonieczny (born 1985), Polish actor and director
- Maria Kuśnierz-Skonieczna (born 1971), Polish choreographer, dance scholar and educator
- Zygmunt Skonieczny (born 1938), Polish documentary filmmaker
