= Konečný =

Konečný (Czech and Slovak feminine: Konečná) is a surname of Czech and Slovak origin. It may refer to:

- Alena Konečná (born 1984), Czech cyclist
- Jakub Konečný (born 2002), Czech ice hockey player
- Jaroslav Konečný (handballer) (1945–2017), Czech handball player
- Kateřina Konečná (born 1981), Czech politician
- Lukáš Konečný (born 1978), Czech boxer
- Martin Konečný (born 1984), Czech gymnast
- Michaela Konečná (born 1998), Czech handball player
- Roman Konečný (born 1983), Slovak footballer
- Tomáš Konečný (born 1977), Czech cyclist
- Travis Konecny (born 1997), Canadian ice hockey player
- Vlastibor Konečný (born 1957), Czech cyclist
- Zdeněk Konečný (1936–2025), Czech basketball player

== See also ==
- Konieczny (Polish form)
