= Princess Theodora =

Princess Theodora may refer to:

- Princess Theodora of Liechtenstein (born 2004), grandniece of Hans-Adam II, Prince of Liechtenstein
- Princess Theodora zu Sayn-Wittgenstein-Berleburg (born 1986), granddaughter of Prince Ludwig Ferdinand of Sayn-Wittgenstein-Berleburg
- Princess Theodora of Hesse-Darmstadt, wife of Antonio Ferrante Gonzaga
- Princess Theodora of Greece and Denmark, daughter of Prince Andrew of Greece and Denmark
- Princess Theodora of Greece and Denmark, daughter of Constantine II of Greece

== See also ==
- Princess Theodora of Greece and Denmark
