= Mafalda von Hessen =

German fashion designer (born 1965)

Princess Mafalda
- Countess Enrico Marone Cinzano; Countess Ferdinando Brachetti Peretti
- Born: 6 July 1965 (age 61); Kiel, West Germany
- Spouse: Count Enrico Marone Cinzano (m. 1989; div. 1990) Carlo Galdo (m. 1991; div. 1999) Count Ferdinando Brachetti Peretti (m. 2000; div. 2014)
- Issue: Tatiana Galdo; Polissena Galdo; Count Cosmo Brachetti Peretti; Count Briano Brachetti Peretti
- House: Hesse
- Father: Moritz, Landgrave of Hesse
- Mother: Princess Tatiana of Sayn-Wittgenstein-Berleburg

Mafalda Margarethe Prinzessin und Landgräfin von Hessen (born 6 July 1965), known also as Princess Mafalda of Hesse, is a German aristocrat and fashion designer. She is the eldest child of Moritz, Landgrave of Hesse and Princess Tatiana of Sayn-Wittgenstein-Berleburg.

== Fashion career ==
Mafalda von Hessen studied at New York University and has a master's degree in design. After graduating, she worked for the Roman costume house Tirelli and the designer Patrick Kinmonth. She has also served as a style ambassador for Giorgio Armani. In autumn 2015, she released her latest collection.

She was named in Vanity Fair's 2007 International Best-Dressed List.

== Marriages and children ==
Mafalda first married Count Enrico Marone Cinzano on 8 July 1989, but they divorced soon after. The marriage was childless.

Second, she married Carlo Galdo on 19 December 1991. They have two daughters. The couple divorced in 1999.

Third, Mafalda married Count Ferdinando Brachetti Peretti on 14 July 2000. They have two sons. They were divorced in 2014.

She is currently married to Baron Rolf Sachs von Opel, son of Gunther (former husband of Brigitte Bardot).

== Ancestry ==
Ancestors of Mafalda von Hessen

16. Frederick William of Hesse-Kassel
8. Prince Frederick Charles of Hesse
17. Princess Anna of Prussia
4. Philipp, Landgrave of Hesse
18. Frederick III, German Emperor
9. Princess Margaret of Prussia
19. Victoria, Princess Royal
2. Moritz, Landgrave of Hesse
20. Umberto I of Italy
10. Victor Emmanuel III of Italy
21. Margherita of Savoy
5. Princess Mafalda of Savoy
22. Nicholas I of Montenegro
11. Princess Elena of Montenegro
23. Milena Vukotić
1. Mafalda von Hessen
24. Gustav of Sayn-Wittgenstein-Berleburg
12. Richard of Sayn-Wittgenstein-Berleburg
25. Marie of Gemmingen
6. Gustav Albrecht of Sayn-Wittgenstein-Berleburg
26. Alfred of Löwenstein-Wertheim-Freudenberg
13. Madeleine of Löwenstein-Wertheim-Freudenberg
27. Pauline of Reichenbach-Lessonitz
3. Tatiana of Sayn-Wittgenstein-Berleburg
28. Gustav Armand Fouché of Otranto
14. Charles Louis Fouché of Otranto
29. Therese of Stedingk
7. Margareta Fouché d'Otrante
30. Ludvig Douglas
15. Hedvig Douglas
31. Anna Ehrensvärd
