= Duke of Otranto =

French Empire nobility title

Dukedom of Otranto
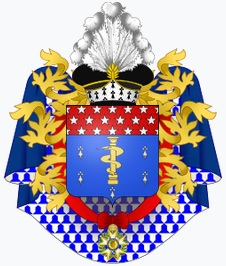
- Arms of the 1st Duke of Otranto
- Creation date: 1809
- Created by: Napoleon I
- First holder: Joseph Fouché, 1st Duke d'Otrante
- Present holder: Charles-Louis Fouché d'Otrante, 8th Duke d'Otrante
- Subsidiary titles: Count Fouché (Comte Fouché)
- Seat: Elghammar Castle

Duke of Otranto (French: Duc d'Otrante) is a hereditary title in the nobility of the First French Empire which was bestowed in 1809 by Emperor Napoleon I upon Joseph Fouché (1759–1820), a French politician and Minister of Police. Fouché had been made a Count of the French Empire previously.

== Background ==
The dukedom was named after the town of Otranto on the east coast of the Salento peninsula in Italy and created – under the French name of Otrante – as a duché grand-fief (a hereditary but nominal honor) in the satellite Kingdom of Naples.

The ducal house of Fouché d'Otrante is still extant in the Kingdom of Sweden, where the dukes have lived since the 19th century.

As of 2025, the title is held by Charles-Louis Armand Fouché d'Otrante, 8th Duke d'Otrante (born in Stockholm, 14 March 1986) who succeeded his father in 1995. He is not a cousin of the King of Denmark, but through the union of Princess Benedikte of Denmark and his father's late cousin, he is remotely related by marriage to Frederik X.

== Genealogy ==
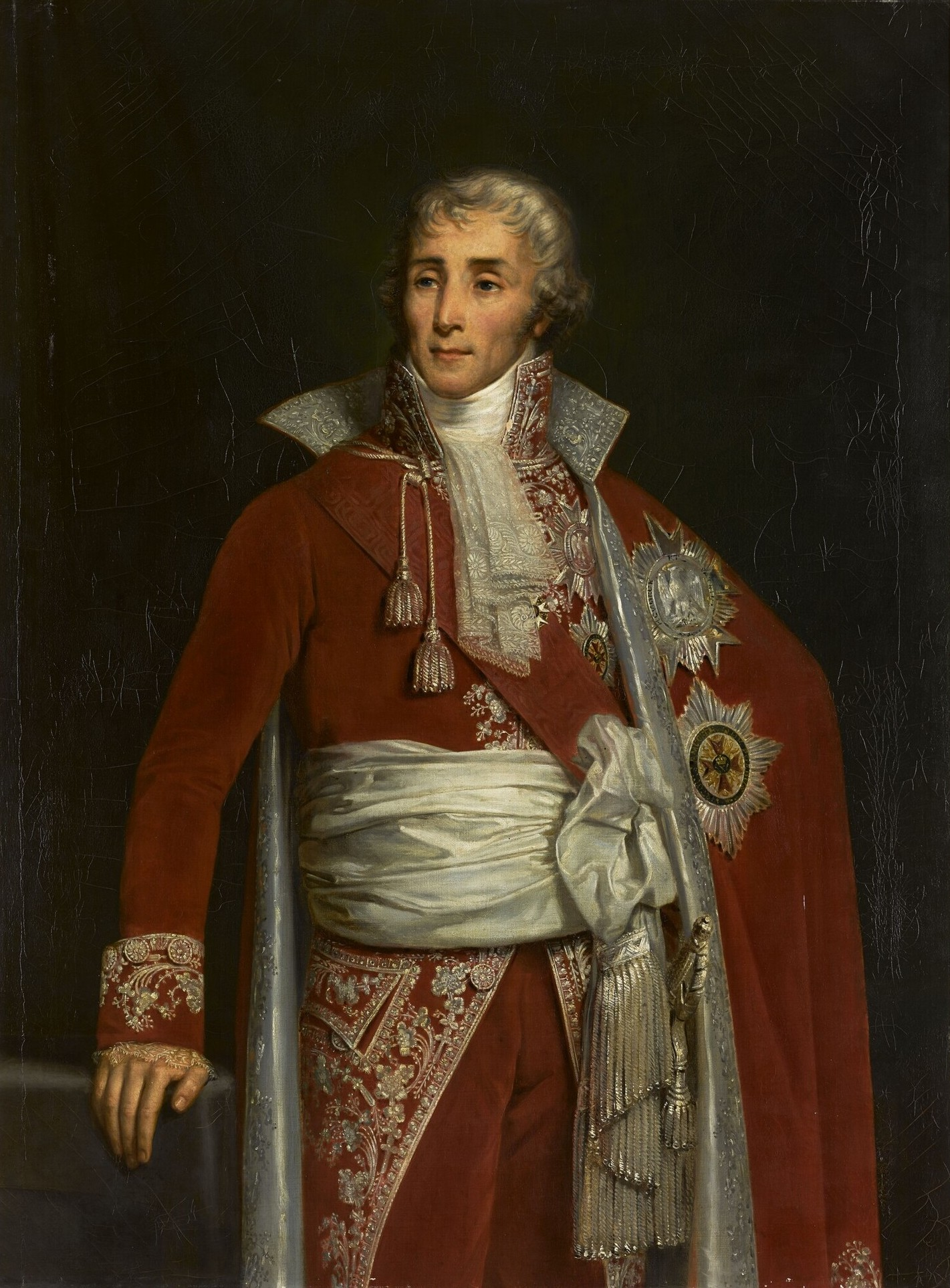
Joseph Fouché,1st Duke d'Otrante

Joseph Fouché, 1st Duke d'Otrante (21 May 1759 Le Pellerin, near Nantes, France – 25 December 1820 Trieste, then Austrian Empire, now Italy), was a son of Julien Joseph Fouché (1719–1771) and wife Marie Françoise Croizet (1720–1793), paternal grandson of Julien Fouché (1667–1745) and wife Marguerite Chiron (1683–1723) and maternal grandson of Jean Croizet (c. 1690–) and wife Marie Chesneau.

By his marriage to Bonne Jeanne Coiquaud (1763–1812), daughter of Nicolas François Coiquaud (1732–1794) and wife Marguerite Gautier (1734–1801), the 1st Duke d'Otrante had the following issue who reached adulthood:

- Joseph Liberté Fouché d'Otrante, 2nd Duke d'Otrante (Saint-Leu-la-Forêt, 22 July 1796 – Paris, 31 December 1862), married to Fortunée Collin de Sussy on 14 July 1824; they separated shortly after without issue.
- Armand François Cyriac Fouché d'Otrante, 3rd Duke d'Otrante (Paris, 25 March 1800 – Stjärnholm, 26 November 1878). Unmarried and without issue.
- Paul Athanase Fouché d'Otrante, 4th Duke d'Otrante (Paris, 25 June 1801 – St. Germain-en-Laye, 10 February 1886), chamberlain to Oscar I of Sweden. Married firstly at Finspång, 24 January 1824 Christina Baroness Palmstierna (Stockholm, 11 February 1799 – Paris, 26 April 1826), without issue, secondly in Stockholm, 18 August 1836 Vilhelmina Amalia Baroness von Stedingk (Turku, Finland, 28 January 1802 – Helsinki, Finland, 25 February 1863), daughter of Victor Baron (Friherre) von Stedingk and wife Lovisa Löf, and thirdly at St. Germain-en-Laye, 9 June 1884 Fronika Marx (Lyon, 4 February 1846 – Paris, 14 March 1887); he had issue, which remained in Sweden:
  - (by second wife) Pauline Ernestine Fouché d'Otrante (25 June 1839 – 22 August 1906), married on 7 November 1861 Ture Count (Greve) Bielke (8 September 1829 – 28 October 1899), son of Nils Count (Greve) Bielke and wife Ebba Baroness (Friherrinna) Sture, and had issue
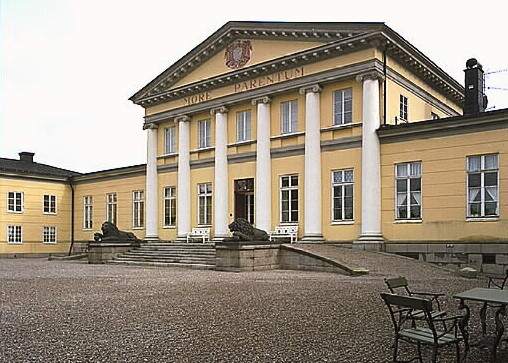
  - Elghammar Castle
    (by second wife) Gustave Armand Fouché d'Otrante, 5th Duke d'Otrante (Paris, 17 June 1840 – Stjernholm, 5 August 1910), married firstly in Stockholm, 2 May 1865 Augusta Baroness Bonde (Gimmersta, 30 August 1846 – Stockholm, 4 March 1872), daughter of Knut Philip Baron Bonde and wife Lady Augusta Fitzclarence, daughter of the 1st Earl of Munster, and secondly in London, 5 July 1873 Therese Baroness von Stedingk (Stockholm, 30 January 1837 – Baden-Baden, 21 June 1901), heiress of Elghammar Castle in Gnesta, Sweden; daughter of Ludvig Baron von Stedingk and wife Lovisa von Haxthausen, and had issue, a daughter and a son:
    - (by first wife) Adelaide Augustine Fouché d'Otrante (Paris, 2 May 1866 – Stockholm, 12 November 1943), married in Stockholm, 14 October 1893 Frederik Mauritz Peyron (Karlskrona, 2 July 1861 – Stockholm, 8 January 1915)
    - (by second wife) Charles Louis Fouché d'Otrante, 6th Duke d'Otrante (Elghammar, 21 June 1877 – Elghammar, 31 May 1950), married at Linköping, 8 June 1906 and divorced in 1931 Hedvig Ingeborg Madeleine Countess Douglas (Gerstorp, 2 September 1886 – Drottningholm, 21 July 1983), daughter of Ludvig Count Douglas (maternal grandson of Louis I, Grand Duke of Baden by Katharina Werner, cr. Countess of Gondelsheim and Langenstein) and wife Anna Countess Ehrensvärd, and had issue, two daughters and two sons:
      - Viktoria Anne Thérèse Fouché d'Otrante (Stockholm, 9 March 1907 – 6 July 2000), married firstly Elghammar, 18 August 1929 and divorced in 1937 Axel Hans Wilhelm Hjalmarsson Bennich (Stockholm, 2 April 1895 – Sundsvall, 12 July 1950), and had issue, and secondly at Elghammar, 29 August 1937 Eugen Frederik Christer Baron von Stedingk (Stockholm, 1 June 1896 – Stockholm, 30 August 1947), and had female issue
      - Margareta Fouché d'Otrante (Elghammar, 28 March 1909 – 25 August 2005), married at Björnlunda, 26 January 1934 H.S.H. Gustav Albrecht Alfred Franz Friedrich Otto Emil Ernst 5th Prince zu Sayn-Wittgenstein-Berleburg (Berleburg, 28 February 1907 – m.i.a. in the Second World War in Russia, 1944, declared dead 29 November 1969), and had issue
      - Gustaf Douglas Armand Fouché d'Otrante, 7th Duke d'Otrante (Björnlunda, 27 November 1912 – Stockholm, 31 January 1995), married at Vendel, 21 October 1967 Metta Christine Gunnel Beata Carolina Countess von Rosen (Stockholm, 24 February 1939), daughter of Count Eugène von Rosen and his second wife Metta Claesdotter Breitholtz who grew up at Örbyhus Castle, and had issue:
        - Marguerite Ebba Fouché d'Otrante (Stockholm, 20 August 1968), unmarried and without issue
        - Pauline Louise Fouché d'Otrante (Stockholm, 14 March 1970), married on 27 May 2000 Mattias Dymling (Stockholm, 3 September 1966)
        - Josephine Madeleine Désirée Fouché d'Otrante (Stockholm, 23 February 1979)
        - Charles-Louis Armand Fouché d'Otrante, 8th Duke d'Otrante (Stockholm, 14 March 1986)
      - Louis Douglas Fouché d'Otrante (Elghammar, 5 March 1917 – 3 November 2010), married in Stockholm, 20 June 1944 Birgitta Helena Christina Tham (Örebro, 11 December 1915 – Stockholm, 5 July 2012), and had female issue:
        - Josephine Ebba Madeleine Fouché d'Otrante (Stockholm, 31 May 1946), married in Stockholm, 26 September 1973 Hans Olof Dyhlen (Stockholm, 23 November 1945), and had issue
        - Agneta Hélène Marie Fouché d'Otrante (Stockholm, 12 February 1948), married in Stockholm, 3 October 1970 H.S.H. Philipp-Reinhard 7th Prince (Fürst) zu Solms-Hohensolms-Lich (Lich, 27 November 1934 – Lich, 28 July 2015), and had issue
  - (by third wife, born before wedlock) Paul Joseph Marie Fouché d'Otrante (Ostend, 21 July 1871 – Buenos Aires, 6 November 1930), married at Villiers-sur-Morin, 24 November 1892 Amélie Adrienne Berthe Ancellin (Crécy-en-Brie, 15 January 1872 – Villiers-sur-Morin, 22 March 1963), and had female issue:
    - Madeleine Paule Fouché d'Otrante (Paris, 14 August 1895 – London, 25 January 1973), unmarried and without issue
    - Thérèse Berthe Fouché d'Otrante (Paris, 28 November 1900 – Meaux, 1 October 1985), married in Paris, 24 December 1946 Jean Arthur Plisson (Rosny-sous-Bois, 27 November 1900 – Meaux, 19 September 1986)
- Joséphine-Ludmille Fouché d'Otrante (1803 – 1893), married to Adolphe Count (Comte) de La Barthe de Thermes (1789–1869), and had issue.

== See also ==
- French nobility
- Dukes in France
- List of French peerages
