= Anna von Bayern =

German journalist and writer

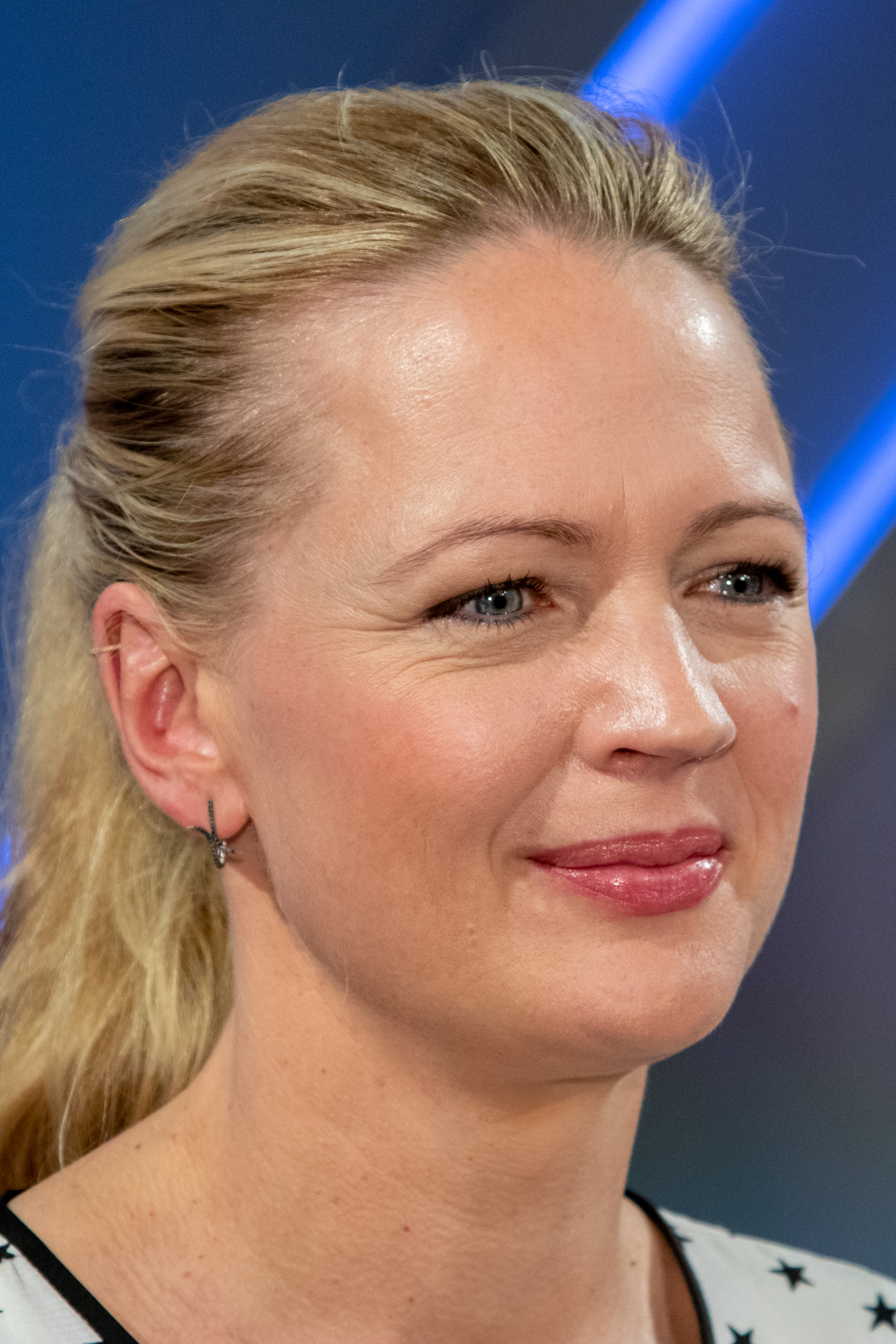
- Pictured in 2019
- Born: 15 March 1978 (age 48); Munich, Germany
- Spouse: Prince Manuel of Bavaria (m. 2005)
- Issue: Prince Leopold; Princess Alba; Prince Gabriel; Prince Joseph
Names
- German: Anna-Natascha Monique Marita Thérèse Prinzessin von Bayern
- House: Sayn-Wittgenstein-Berleburg
- Father: Prince Ludwig Ferdinand of Sayn-Wittgenstein-Berleburg
- Mother: Countess Yvonne Wachtmeister af Johannishus
- Religion: Catholicism
- Occupation: Journalist, writer

Princess Anna of Bavaria (German: Anna-Natascha Prinzessin von Bayern; née Princess Anna-Natascha zu Sayn-Wittgenstein-Berleburg; born 15 March 1978), known professionally as Anna von Bayern, is a German journalist and author who has been as the Chief Corporate Affairs Officer at Coty Inc. since 2020. A member of the House of Sayn-Wittgenstein-Berleburg by birth, she became a member of the House of Wittelsbach in 2005 through her marriage to Prince Manuel of Bavaria.

== Early life and education ==
She was born Princess Anna zu Sayn-Wittgenstein-Berleburg in Munich in 1978, the daughter of Prince Ludwig Ferdinand of Sayn-Wittgenstein-Berleburg and Countess Yvonne Wachtmeister af Johannishus. She has three siblings, including the actor August Wittgenstein (Prince August Fredrik zu Sayn-Wittgenstein-Berleburg) and Princess Theodora zu Sayn-Wittgenstein-Berlebrug.

Her paternal grandparents were Prince Ludwig Ferdinand of Sayn-Wittgenstein-Berleburg and Princess Friederike Juliane of Salm-Horstmar. She is the great-granddaughter of Richard, 4th Prince of Sayn-Wittgenstein-Berleburg and Princess Madeleine of Löwenstein-Wertheim-Freudenberg.

She graduated in History and Politics from Stanford University and with an MA in creative writing from the University of East Anglia.

== Career ==
Von Bayern began her career at Publicis in Paris and then attended journalism school at Axel Springer Academy in Berlin. She was a member of the Federal Press Conference. She worked as a political correspondent for Bild am Sonntag, having previously written for Die Welt.

In 2010, von Bayern wrote a biography of Karl-Theodor zu Guttenberg. In March 2014, she published her second book, named Now even more!, about politician Wolfgang Bosbach, who was suffering from cancer at the time.

== Other activities ==
- German-Swedish Association (DSV), Patron (since 2018)
- Museum Berggruen, Member of the International Council

== Marriage ==
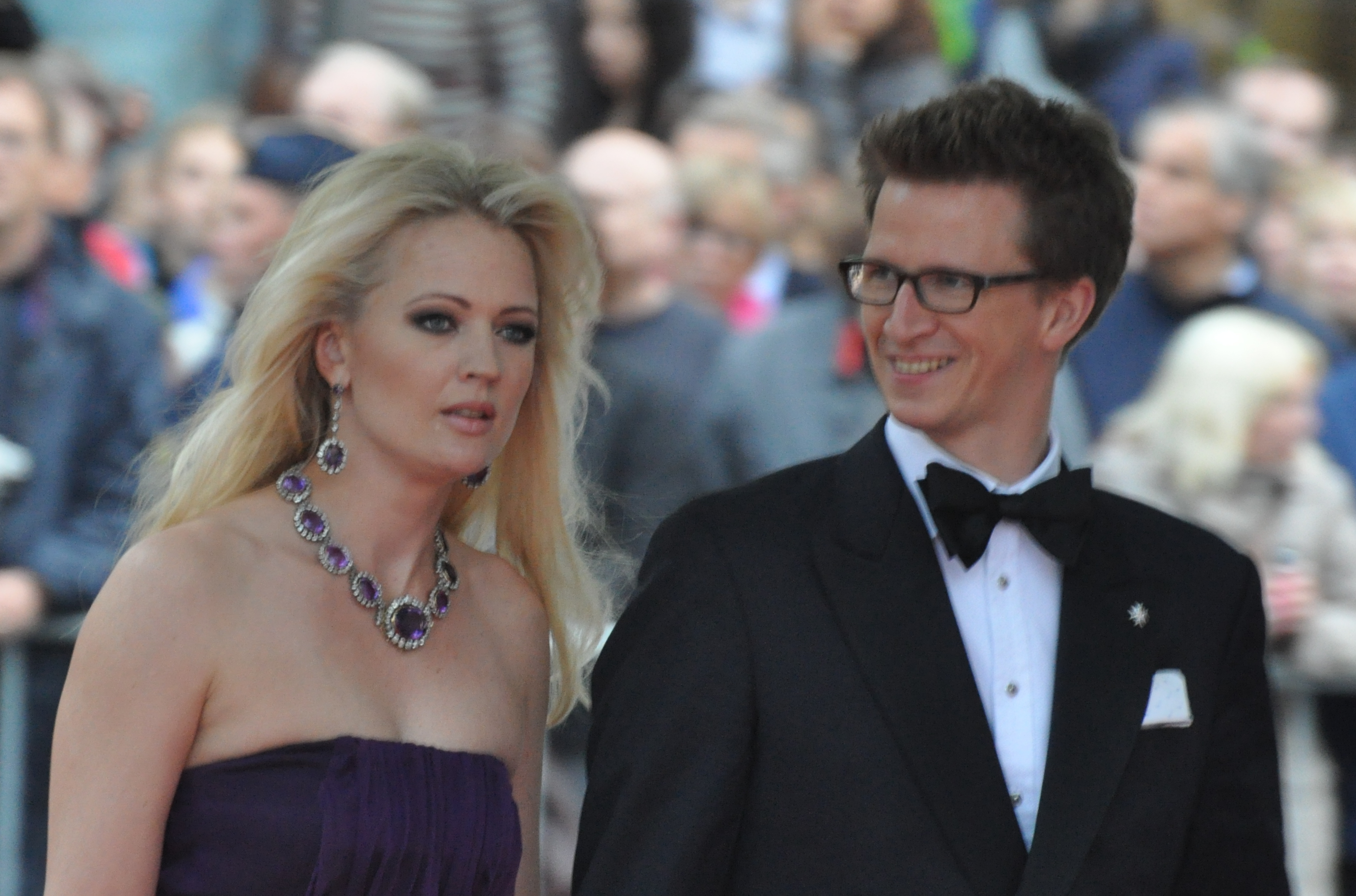
Princess Anna and her husband at the wedding of Victoria, Crown Princess of Sweden, and Daniel Westling

On 6 August 2005, she married Prince Manuel of Bavaria, the elder son of Prince Leopold of Bavaria and Ursula Möhlenkamp. The wedding took place in Stigtomta and Bärbo, small villages near Nyköping in Sweden. It was attended by more than 300 guests, including King Carl XVI Gustaf of Sweden, Queen Silvia of Sweden and their daughters, the princesses Victoria and Madeleine.

The couple has four children together:

- Prince Leopold Maria Bengt Karl Manuel of Bavaria (b. 13 June 2007).
- Princess Alba Manuelle Maria Petra Yvonne of Bavaria (b. 5 January 2010).
- Prince Gabriel Maria Abraham Ludwig Theodor of Bavaria (b. 11 November 2014).
- Prince Joseph Carlos Maria Paul Melchior of Bavaria (b. 18 July 2019).

== Honours ==
- Recipient of the 70th Birthday Badge Medal of King Carl XVI Gustaf (Kingdom of Sweden, 30 April 2016).
- Recipient of the King Carl XVI Gustaf and Queen Silvia's Golden Wedding Medal (Kingdom of Sweden, 13 June 2026).
