= Lockvattnet =

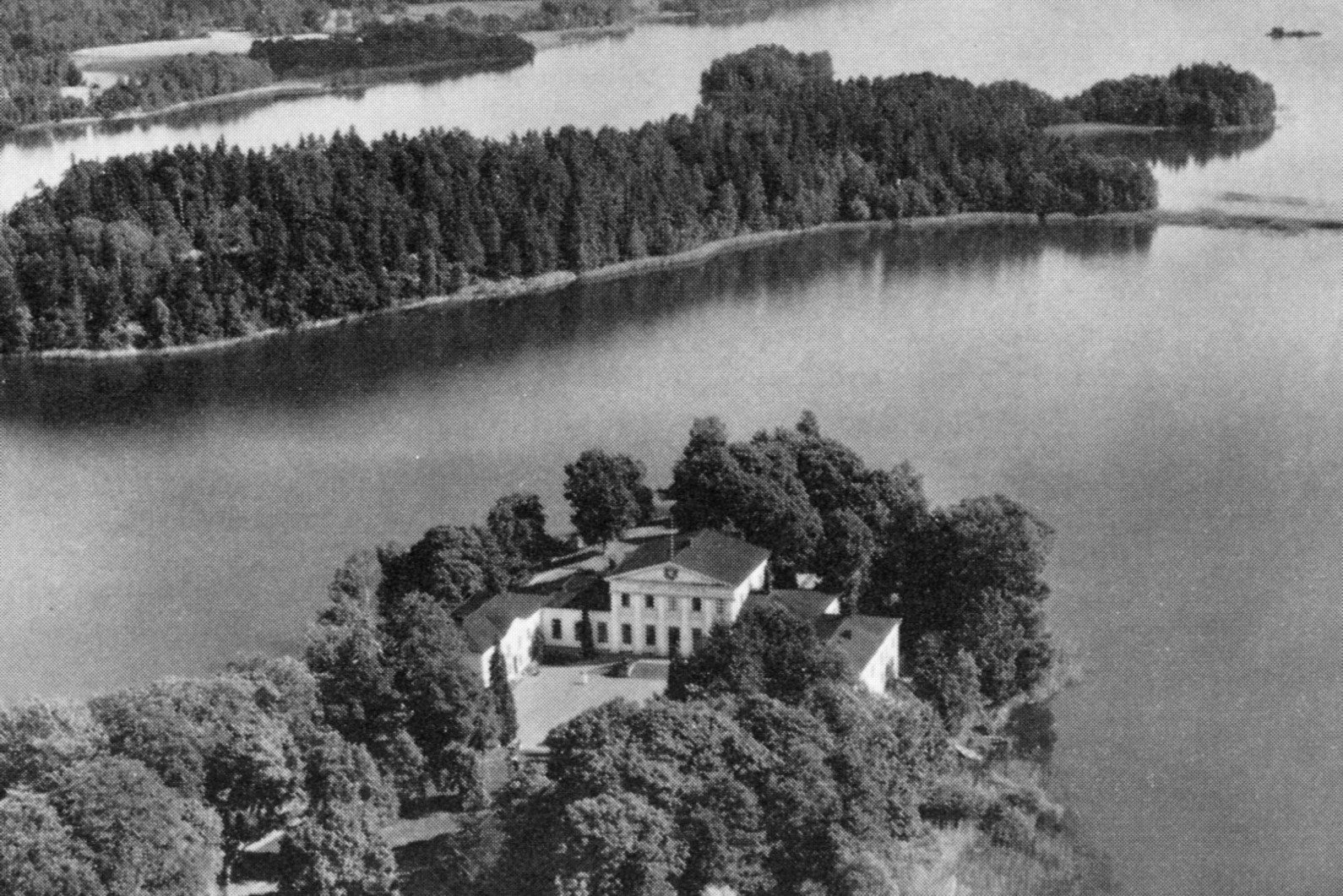
- Elghammar Castle on the banks of Lockvattnet

- Location within Södermanland
- Coordinates: 59°03′N 17°05′E
- Basin countries: Sweden

Lockvattnet (formerly called Lekvattnet) is a lake in Gnesta municipality in Södermanland, Sweden and is part of the Trosaån River main catchment area. The lake has an area of 2.26 square miles and lies 82.7 feet above sea level.

The lake is located east of Båven, between Björnlunda and Stjärnhov Castle. At the northern end of the lake is Elghammar Castle (sometimes spelled Älghammar).

== Sub-catchment area ==
Lockvattnet is included in the sub-catchment area (654676-157416) that Swedish Meteorological and Hydrological Institute calls the Outlet of Lockvattnet. The average elevation is 0.02 miles above sea level and the area is 6.7 square miles. There are no catchment areas upstream, but the catchment area is the highest point. The Väla River that drains the catchment area has a tributary order of 2, which means that the water flows through a total of 2 waterways before reaching the sea after 1 mile. The catchment area consists mostly of forest and has 2.3 square miles of water surface, giving it a lake percentage of 33.4%.

== See also ==
- List of lakes of Sweden
