= Visnaren =

Lake in Strängnäs Municipality, Sweden

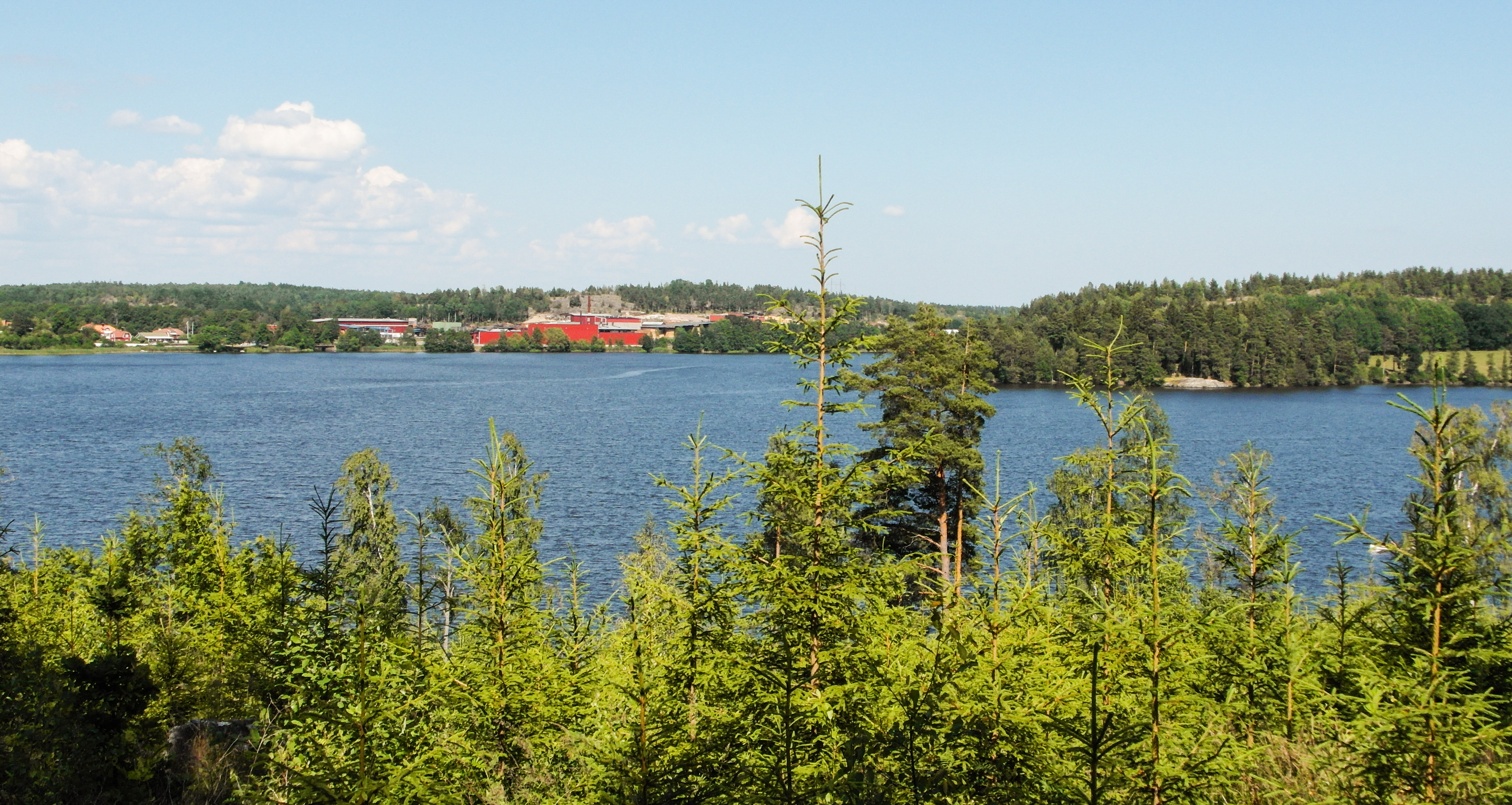
- View of Visnaren Lake

- Location within Södermanland
- Coordinates: 59°15′N 17°06′E
- Basin countries: Sweden

Visnaren is a lake south of Åkers Styckebruk in the municipality of Strängnäs inSödermanland, Sweden and is part of the Norrström main drainage area. The lake has an area of 1.13 square kilometers and lies 9.9 meters above sea level. The lake is drained by the Råckstaån (Bergaån) watercourse, which flows into Läggesta, connected to Lake Mälaren. Visnaren is also the northernmost lake in a rift valley that continues southward through the Marvikarna lakes and Lake Klämmingen in the Gnesta municipality, which flows into the Baltic Sea via Trosaån.

Visnaren separated from Lake Mälaren around the time of the birth of Christ. The name has been interpreted by Svante Strandberg as "the lake at the water bend", referring to the water bend that previously ran from Gripsholmsviken along the Råckstaån towards Visnaren.

It is about 50 km west of the capital Stockholm, in the east of the country.

== Sub-catchment area ==
Visnaren is part of a sub-catchment area (656984-157476) that SMHI calls the Visnaren Outfall. The average elevation is 23 meters above sea level and the area is 3.83 square kilometers. If the 21 catchment areas upstream are included, the accumulated area is 211.2 square kilometers. The Råcksta River (Bergaån) that drains the catchment area has a tributary order of 2, which means that the water flows through a total of 2 watercourses before reaching the sea after 78 kilometers. The catchment area consists mostly of forest (40%). The catchment area has 1.1 square kilometers of water surface, which gives it a lake coverage of 28.8%. The built-up area in the region covers an area of 0.48 square kilometers, or 12% of the catchment area.
