= August Wittgenstein =

21st-century German-Swedish actor

Prince August
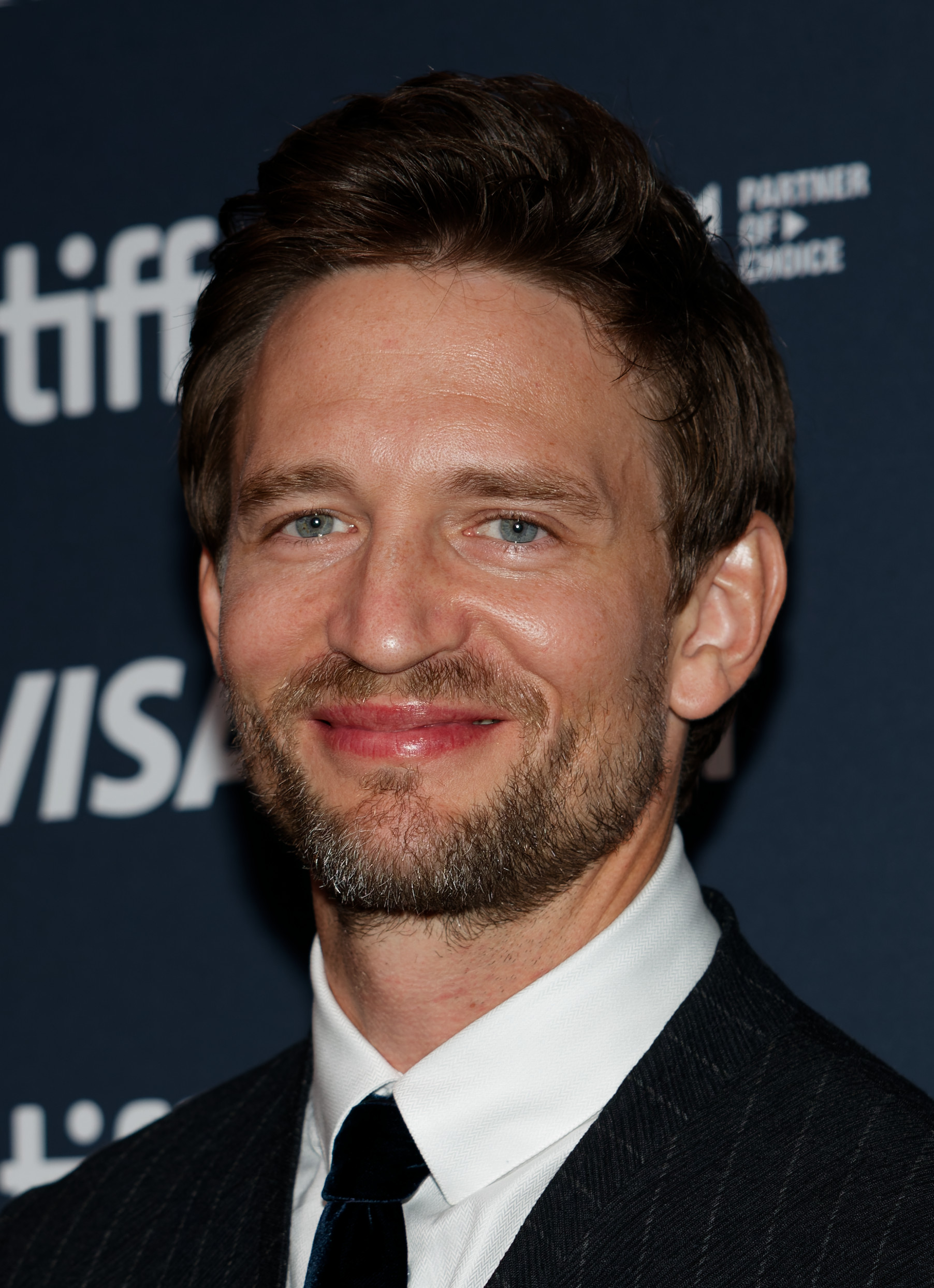
- Wittgenstein at the 2024 Toronto International Film Festival
- Born: 22 January 1981 (age 45); Siegen, North Rhine-Westphalia; West Germany
- Spouse: Mia Rohla (m. 2022)
- German: August Fredrik Prinz zu Sayn-Wittgenstein-Berleburg
- House: Sayn-Wittgenstein-Berleburg
- Father: Prince Ludwig Ferdinand of Sayn-Wittgenstein-Berleburg
- Mother: Countess Yvonne Wachtmeister af Johannishus
- Occupation: Actor

Prince August Fredrik zu Sayn-Wittgenstein-Berleburg (German: August Fredrik Prinz zu Sayn-Wittgenstein-Berleburg), known professionally as August Wittgenstein, (born 22 January 1981) is a German-Swedish actor and member of the princely House of Sayn-Wittgenstein-Berleburg. Wittgenstein has appeared in English, German, and Swedish language films, starring in the 2013 German television movie Open Desert. He is known for his portrayals of Georg Donatus, Hereditary Grand Duke of Hesse in The Crown and Count Alfred Eckbrecht von Dürckheim-Montmartin in Ludwig II as well as his roles as Karl Tennstedt in Das Boot and Andreas Wolf in Deadwind.

== Early life and education ==
Wittgenstein was born on 22 January 1981 in Siegen, North Rhine-Westphalia and is a member of the House of Sayn-Wittgenstein-Berleburg, an old German noble family. He is the younger son of Prince Ludwig Ferdinand of Sayn-Wittgenstein-Berleburg and Countess Yvonne Wachtmeister af Johannishus, a member of the Swedish nobility. His paternal grandparents were Prince Ludwig Ferdinand of Sayn-Wittgenstein-Berleburg and Princess Friederike Juliane of Salm-Horstmar. He is the great-grandson of Richard, 4th Prince of Sayn-Wittgenstein-Berleburg and Princess Madeleine of Löwenstein-Wertheim-Freudenberg. Wittgenstein is the brother of the journalist and writer Princess Anna of Bavaria and of Princess Theodora zu Wittgenstein. He grew up speaking both German and Swedish and is a dual citizen.

When he was fifteen, Wittgenstein attended a boarding school in Sweden. After completing school, he lived in the United Kingdom, Paris, and Australia. He later graduated from Georgetown University. From 2005 until 2007 he studied acting at the American Academy of Dramatic Arts.

== Career ==
Wittgenstein started his acting career in 2008 with some roles in short films. In 2009 he had a role as a Swiss Guard in the film Angels & Demons. In 2011 he had a supporting role in the Swedish drama Avalon. He portrayed Count Alfred Eckbrecht von Dürckheim-Montmartin in the 2012 German feature film Ludwig II. In 2013 he played the role of Travis in the science fiction drama The Congress.

In 2013, Wittgenstein landed his first starring role in the German television movie Open Desert. He played the role of Georg Donatus, Hereditary Grand Duke of Hesse in The Crown. He has also had roles in Das Boot, Die Schlikkerfrauen, Ein starkes Team: Späte Rache, In Your Dreams, Notruf Hafenkante, Deadwind, Leipzig Homicide, Cologne P.D., SOKO München, Nord bei Nordwest, Ein Lächeln nachts um vier, Ku'damm 56, Jenny – echt gerecht, and Josephine Klick – Allein unter Cops.

== Personal life ==
In 2021, Wittgenstein and Austrian psychologist and podcaster Mia Rohla became engaged. She is the daughter of the Austrian businessman and television personality Martin Rohla. They were married September 3, 2022 in Vienna.
