= Margareta Fouché =

Franco-Swedish-German noble (1909–2005)

Margareta Fouché d'Otrante
- The Princess of Sayn-Wittgenstein-Berleburg
- Born: 28 March 1909; Elghammar, Björnlunda
- Died: 25 August 2005 (aged 96); Bad Berleburg
- Burial: Forest Cemetery Sengelsberg, Berleburg
- Spouse: Gustav Albrecht, 5th Prince of Sayn-Wittgenstein-Berleburg (m. 1934; died 1969)
- Issue: Prince Richard; Princess Madeleine; Prince Robin; Princess Tatiana; Princess Pia
- Father: Charles Louis Fouché, 6th Duke of Otranto
- Mother: Countess Hedvig Douglas

Margareta Fouché d'Otrante, Princess of Sayn-Wittgenstein-Berleburg (28 March 1909 – 25 August 2005) was the wife of Gustav Albrecht, 5th Prince of Sayn-Wittgenstein-Berleburg, and mother of Richard, 6th Prince of Sayn-Wittgenstein-Berleburg, who married Princess Benedikte of Denmark.

== Biography ==
The daughter of Charles Louis Fouché, 6th Duke of Otranto (a descendant of Napoleonic statesman Joseph Fouché) and his first wife, Countess Hedvig Ingeborg Madeleine Douglas (a descendant of Louis I, Grand Duke of Baden), she was born Margareta Fouché d'Otrante in Elghammar, Sweden.

Her husband, Rittmeister Gustav Albrecht, was the head of the mediatized princely house of Sayn-Wittgenstein-Berleburg. He went missing in action in 1944, during World War II, and was declared legally dead in 1969. From 1944 to 1955, after her husband was reported missing, Margareta became the guardian for her son, Prince Richard, and managed her late husband's properties. The family went into exile in her native Sweden. Prince Richard later married Princess Benedikte of Denmark, sister of Margrethe II and Anne-Marie of Greece.
