= Tornbergssjön =

Lake in Sweden

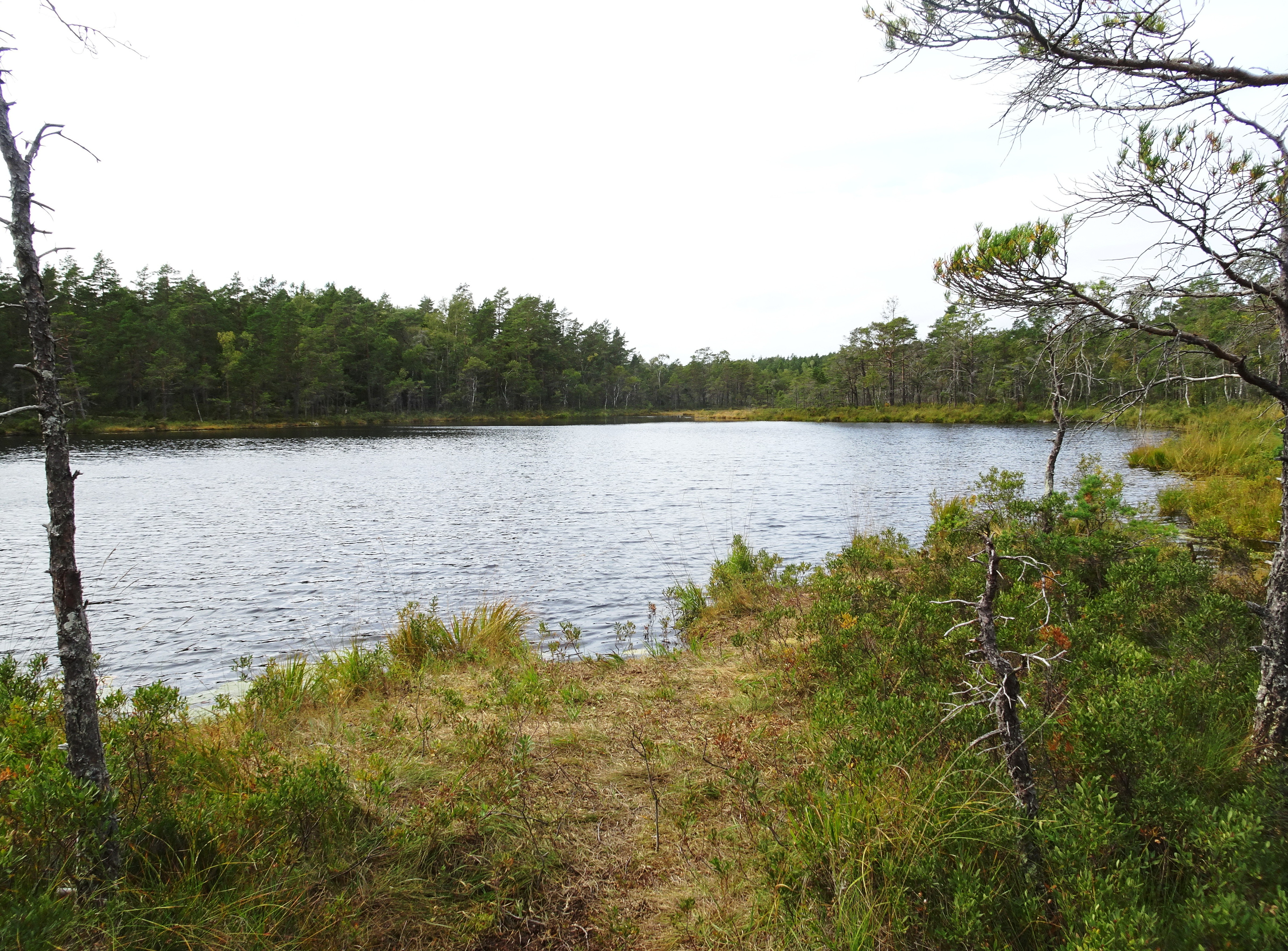

- Location within Stockholm
- Coordinates: 59°08′04″N 18°01′22″E
- Basin countries: Sweden
- Surface area: ~11,000 m^{2} (120,000 sq ft)
- Surface elevation: 90 m (300 ft)

Tornbergssjön is a lake of Södermanland, Sweden. The lake inherits its name from the nearby peak Tornberget, which at 111 meters above sea level is the highest point in Stockholm County.
