= Bernhart Fürst zu Sayn-Wittgenstein-Hohenstein =

Bernhart
- Prince of Sayn-Wittgenstein-Hohenstein

Head of the House of Sayn-Wittgenstein-Hohenstein
- Period: 17 August 1983 - present
- Predecessor: Christian-Heinrich, 5th Prince of Sayn-Wittgenstein-Hohenstein
- Heir-Apparent: Prince Wenzel
- Born: 15 November 1962 (age 63); Marburg, Germany
- Spouse: Countess Katharina von Podewils-Durniz (m. 1996)
- Issue: Wenzel, Hereditary Prince of Sayn-Wittgenstein-Hohenstein
- Father: Christian-Heinrich, 5th Prince of Sayn-Wittgenstein-Hohenstein
- Mother: Princess Dagmar of Sayn-Wittgenstein-Hohenstein
- Religion: Lutheran

Bernhart Otto Peter Fürst zu Sayn-Wittgenstein-Hohenstein is a German businessman and the current head of the Princely House of Sayn-Wittgenstein-Hohenstein.

== Early life ==
Sayn-Wittgenstein-Hohenstein was born in Marburg the son of Christian-Heinrich, Prince of Sayn-Wittgenstein-Hohenstein and his second wife, Princess Dagmar of Sayn-Wittgenstein-Hohenstein.

== Personal life ==
Prince Bernhart was married at Castle Schwarzenau, Germany on 31 August 1996 to Countess Katharina von Podewils-Dürniz, the daughter of the German diplomat Count Max von Podewils-Dürniz and his wife Baroness Elisabeth von Hirschberg. She has a doctorate in Art History and in 2003 was appointed Sotheby's representative in Hamburg. The couple have one child, Wenzel Max, Hereditary Prince (Erbprinz) of Sayn-Wittgenstein-Hohenstein (b. 1997).

== Career ==
Prince Bernhart is Chairman of the Board of the Fürst Wittgenstein`sche Waldbesitzergesellschaft Forestry company and also joint Managing Director of Verlag Dashoefer publishers. He was the patron of the 300th Anniversary celebrations for the Schwarzenau Brethren, which were held on his estate in 2008.

== Succession to the Hohenstein secundogeniture ==
Four dynastic branches of the princely House of Sayn were extant at the beginning of the 20th century, each possessing its own secundogeniture. In order of seniority of legitimate descent from their progenitor, Ludwig I, Count of Sayn-Wittgenstein (1532-1605), they were the:

1. Princes (Fürsten) zu Sayn-Wittgenstein-Berleburg, descended from Count Georg (1565-1631)
2. Princes (Fürsten) zu Sayn-Wittgenstein-Sayn, descended from Count Christian Ludwig (1725-1797)
3. Counts (Grafen) zu Sayn-Wittgenstein-Berleburg, descended from Count Georg Ernst (1735-1792)
4. Princes (Fürsten) zu Sayn-Wittgenstein-Hohenstein, descended from Count Ludwig (1571-1634)

Some of these lines had junior branches, dynastic and non-dynastic, the latter including families whose right to the princely title was recognized by the Russian, Prussian and Bavarian monarchies, whereas other morganatic branches used lesser titles in Germany.

On the death of Ludwig, 3rd Prince of Sayn-Wittgenstein-Sayn in 1912, the eldest of his three sons, Hereditary Prince August (1868-1947), became 4th Prince of Sayn-Wittgenstein-Hohenstein and head of the third branch of the House of Sayn. Being a childless bachelor, the elder of whose two younger brothers, Georg (1873-1960), had married morganatically, while the younger, Wilhelm (1877-1958), was 49 and yet unmarried, August preserved the name and heritage of his branch of the House of Sayn by adopting Christian Heinrich Prinz zu Sayn-Wittgenstein-Berleburg (1908-1953). He was the second son of the late head of the entire House of Sayn, Richard, 4th Prince of Sayn-Wittgenstein-Berleburg (1882-1925), whose eldest son, Gustav Albrecht, 5th Prince of Sayn-Wittgenstein-Berleburg (1907-1944) had inherited the senior line's fortune and position.

In November 1960 Christian Heinrich, being the divorced father of two daughters by his dynastic marriage to Beatrix Grafin von Bismarck-Schönhausen (1921-2006), married Dagmar Prinzessin zu Sayn-Wittgenstein-Hohenstein (1919-2002), elder daughter of his adopted father's younger brother, Georg, who died seven months before the wedding. As Georg's children by his morganatic wife, Marie Rühm, (created Baroness von Freusburg by the reigning Prince of Lippe in 1916) had been de-morganatized by declaration of their uncle August on 11 February 1947, her marriage to Christian Heinrich was deemed a dynastic match, ensuring that their son Bernhart would be born in compliance with the house laws of his adoptive ancestors, the Sayn-Wittgenstein-Hohensteins, as well as being a grandson of the last dynastic male of that family, Prince Georg.
