= Prince Robin of Sayn-Wittgenstein-Berleburg =

German noble

Prince Robin
- Born: 29 January 1938 (age 88); Gießen, Germany
- Spouse: Birgitta af Klercker (m. 1970; div. 1979) Marie-Christine Heftler-Louiche (m. 1979)
- Issue: Prince Sebastian; Princess Natascha; Princess Marie
Names
- Robin Alexander Wolfgang Udo Eugen Wilhelm Gottfried
- House: Sayn-Wittgenstein-Berleburg
- Father: Gustav Albrecht, 5th Prince of Sayn-Wittgenstein-Berleburg
- Mother: Margareta Fouché d'Otrante

Prince Robin of Sayn-Wittgenstein-Berleburg (Robin Alexander Wolfgang Udo Eugen Wilhelm Gottfried; born 29 January 1938) is the son of Gustav Albrecht, 5th Prince of Sayn-Wittgenstein-Berleburg and his wife, Franco-Swedish noblewoman Margareta Fouché d'Otrante.

A banker, he married, firstly, in New York 29 January 1970 (and divorced in 1979) Swedish noblewoman Birgitta af Klercker, born in Stockholm in 1942, with whom he had issue;

- Prince Sebastian of Sayn-Wittgenstein-Berleburg, born in New York 30 January 1971, married 2002 to Julie Toussaint, by whom he had three children.
- Princess Natascha of Sayn-Wittgenstein-Berleburg, born in New York 24 November 1973, married 2008 to Don Eugenio Litta-Modignani, Marchese di Menzago e Vinago, by whom she had one daughter.

He married, secondly, 29 November 1979 Marie-Christine Heftler-Louiche, born in Paris 1938, and had issue.

- Princess Marie of Sayn-Wittgenstein-Berleburg, born in Paris 11 July 1980, married 2005 to Olivier Le Maire.

Robin is a younger brother of Richard, 6th Prince of Sayn-Wittgenstein-Berleburg, husband of Princess Benedikte of Denmark. Because she maintained her responsibilities as a princess in her native land after marriage and spends a substantial portion of her time there, she retained the prospect of transmitting Danish succession rights to her own children under specific conditions. No final ruling on the dynastic status in Denmark of his brother's son, Prince Gustav having been issued, Robin and, after him, his son Sebastian and grandson Ferdinand followed Gustav in the line of succession to inherit the Berleburg legacy in the event Gustav were to renounce it to take up permanent residence in Denmark, or if he were to die without any direct male heirs until the birth of Prince Gustav Albrecht, son of the 7th Prince, in 2023.
