= Enrico Marone Cinzano =

Italian noble and financier

- Born: April 5, 1963 (age 63)
- Occupations: Financier, entrepreneur, artist
- Spouse: Mafalda von Hessen (m. 1989; sep. 1990)

Count Enrico Marone Cinzano (born April 5, 1963) is a financier, entrepreneur and artist from Turin, Italy. His work is based on the integration of Nature and technology, and his designs incorporate reclaimed, third party-certified sustainable as well as recycled materials and are built using eco-friendly construction techniques, with the support of advanced well-being focused technologies.

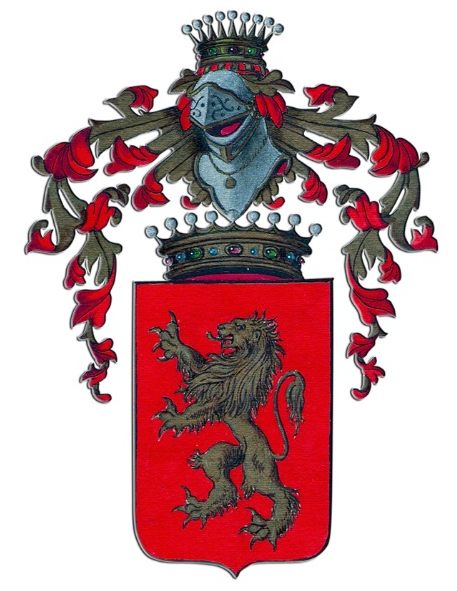
Marone Family Crest

== Early life ==
Marone Cinzano was born to Count Alberto Paolo Marone Cinzano who died in 1989 in a car crash on his way to visit King Juan Carlos of Spain and Cristina Marone Cinzano, (born Countess Camerana). He attended boarding school at Aiglon College and Mount Kelly School, a private school in the UK. Subsequently, he graduated with a BS business administration at Babson College, Massachusetts. He then worked in advertising, banking, and became a real-estate developer, before co-founding the environmentally friendly fashion company Project Alabama in the year 2000, which he sold in 2010. Project Alabama's accolades include winner of the 2003 Ecco Domani award and runner up for the 2005 CFDA award.

== Career ==
In 2007, Marone Cinzano established ToTheCube LLC, under which he presented the Enrico Marone Cinzano Collection www.enrico.art. The company focuses on ethical and sustainable homes and home products. He creates living spaces and sculptural art utilizing natural, recycled, third party certified sustainable materials, as well as avant-garde technologies, with the intention of providing well being in home environments. His work has been exhibited in group and solo shows, is represented by Pearl Lam Galleries in Hong Kong and Shanghai, Spazio Rossana Orlandi in Milan, FriedmanBenda in New York City and also collaborated with Shanghai-based Stellar Works, and has shown at Art Basel HK, PAD London and Design Miami in Miami. In 2011, Marone Cinzano became a member of ADI, the industrial design organization based in Milan, Italy that brings professionals, researchers, teachers, critics, journalists, and the like together to examine the foremost topics of design. His museum shows have included a presence at the Museo Bagatti Valsecchi in Milan and the Museo Nazionale della Scienza e della Tecnologia di Milano.

In 2012, Marone Cinzano applied the same ethos to architecture and interior design, developing property in New York and London, based on recovered non-toxic materials to create healthy living spaces: in 2017, he was invited as a speaker to a TED conference in King's College London, to discuss health and well-being in the home.

== Family history ==
His family founded the epymous Cinzano wine company in 1757, his maternal great grandfather, Giovanni Agnelli, was the founder of FIAT Automobiles in 1899. Other notable relatives include Argentinian diplomat Amancio Alcorta and former President of Argentina Jose Figueroa Alcorta. His step-grandmother, Infanta Maria Cristina de Borbon y Battenberg, a member of the Spanish royal family, was the daughter of Spanish King Alfonso XIII and Spanish Queen Victoria Eugenie of Battenberg, who in turn was the grand-daughter of Queen Victoria. His grandfather, Enrico, was named the 1st Count Marone by King Victor Emmanuel III of Italy on May 13, 1940, to mark his marriage to the HRH Infanta Maria Cristina.

== Personal life ==
On July 8, 1989, Marone Cinzano married Princess Mafalda of Hesse, also a descendant of Queen Victoria, the couple have since separated. He lived in the Bacchus House in New York City, where he was known for his glamorous and extravagant lifestyle. He sold the property to Napster founder and Facebook executive Sean Parker. He currently lives in London and has a daughter.

== Ancestry ==
Ancestors of Enrico Marone Cinzano

16. Bernardo Marone
8. Alberto Marone
17. Maria Prince
4. Count Enrico Eugenio Marone Cinzano
18. Enrico Cinzano
9. Paola Cinzano
19. Maria Teresa Rossi
2. Count Alberto Marone Cinzano
20. Amancio Mariano Alcorta Palacio
10. Rodolfo Alcorta Martinez
21. Manuela Martínez Acuña
5. Noemí Rosa de Alcorta y Mansilla
22. Carlos Alberto Mansilla
11. Maria Rosa Mansilla Godoy
23. Celia Godoy
1. Enrico Marone Cinzano
24. Carlo Camerana
12. Vittorio Camerana
25. Adele Arborio
6. Count Giancarlo Camerana
26. Antonio Winspeare
13. Giuseppina Winspeare
27. Albina Guicciardi
3. Countess Cristina Camerana
14. Carlo of the barons Nasi
7. Laura Nasi
30. Giovanni Agnelli
15. Caterina Agnelli
31. Clara Boselli
