= Sayn-Wittgenstein-Berleburg =

County ruled by the House of Sayn-Wittgenstein

County of Sayn-Wittgenstein-Berleburg Grafschaft Sayn-Wittgenstein-Berleburg
- 1607–1806
- Coat of arms
- Status: State of the Holy Roman Empire
- Capital: Berleburg
- Common languages: Westphalian
- Government: Principality
- Historical era: Middle Ages
  - Partitioned from Sayn-Wittgenstein: 1607
  - Partitioned to create S-W-Homburg and S-W-Neumagen: 1631
  - Raised to Principality: 1792
  - Mediatised to Hesse: 1806
  - Annexed by Prussia: 1816
Preceded by	Succeeded by
Image missing / Sayn-Wittgenstein	Grand Duchy of Hesse

The coat of arms of the Princes of Sayn-Wittgenstein-Berleburg

Berleburg Castle

Sayn-Wittgenstein-Berleburg was one of several imperial counties and later principalities ruled by the House of Sayn-Wittgenstein.

Most of the former county is located in the present district of Siegen-Wittgenstein (in the modern state of North Rhine-Westphalia), Germany. The residence was the town and palace in Berleburg (now Bad Berleburg).

== History ==
Sayn-Wittgenstein-Berleburg was a partition of Sayn-Wittgenstein in the 16th century; the southern and more-developed portion was the County of Sayn-Wittgenstein-Wittgenstein with its seat Laaspe (now Bad Laasphe) and its residence Wittgenstein Castle, whereas Berleburg is tucked away in a very rural landscape in the midst of vast forests. Sayn-Wittgenstein-Berleburg was raised from a county with Imperial immediacy to an immediate principality (Reichsfürstentum) in 1792, and was mediatised to the Grand Duchy of Hesse in 1806 before being annexed to Prussia in 1816.

== Counts and reigning princes ==
=== Counts of Sayn-Wittgenstein-Berleburg (1607–1792) ===
- Georg V (1565–1631, ruled 1607–1631)
- Ludwig Casimir (1598–1643, ruled 1631–1643)
- Georg Wilhelm (1636–1684, ruled 1643–1684)
- Ludwig Franz (1660–1694, ruled 1684–1694)
- Casimir (1687–1741, ruled 1694–1741)
- Ludwig Ferdinand (1712–1773, ruled 1741–1773)
- Christian Heinrich (1753–1800, ruled as Graf 1773–1792)

=== Princes of Sayn-Wittgenstein-Berleburg (since 1792) ===
- Christian Heinrich, 1st Prince of Sayn-Wittgenstein-Berleburg (1753–1800, ruled as Fürst 1792–1800)
- Albrecht, 2nd Prince of Sayn-Wittgenstein-Berleburg (1777–1851, ruled 1800–1806)
- Albrecht, 3rd Prince of Sayn-Wittgenstein-Berleburg (1834–1904)
- Richard, 4th Prince of Sayn-Wittgenstein-Berleburg (27 May 1882 – 25 April 1925)
- Gustav Albrecht, 5th Prince of Sayn-Wittgenstein-Berleburg (28 February 1907 – 1944, declared dead 29 November 1969)
- Richard, 6th Prince of Sayn-Wittgenstein-Berleburg (29 October 1934 – 13 March 2017)
- Gustav, 7th Prince of Sayn-Wittgenstein-Berleburg (born 12 January 1969)

== Line of succession ==
Five branches of the House of Sayn were extant by the end of the 19th and the beginning of the 20th century, each having inherited its own appanage while the family enjoyed Imperial immediacy as vassals of the Holy Roman Empire. In order of seniority of legitimate descent from their progenitor, Ludwig I, Count of Sayn-Wittgenstein (1532-1605), they were the:

1. Princes (Fürsten) zu Sayn-Wittgenstein-Berleburg, descended from Count Georg (1565-1631)
2. Counts (Grafen) zu Sayn-Wittgenstein-Karlsburg, descended from Count Karl Wilhelm (1693-1749)
3. Princes (Fürsten) zu Sayn-Wittgenstein-Sayn, descended from Count Christian Ludwig (1725-1797)
4. Counts (Grafen) zu Sayn-Wittgenstein-Berleburg, descended from Count Georg Ernst (1735-1792)
5. Princes (Fürsten) zu Sayn-Wittgenstein-Hohenstein, descended from Count Ludwig (1571-1634)

Some of these lines further splintered into cadet branches, both dynastic and non-dynastic, the latter including families whose right to the princely title was recognized by the Russian, Prussian or Bavarian monarchies, whereas other morganatic branches used lesser titles in Germany.

On the death of Ludwig, 3rd Prince of Sayn-Wittgenstein-Hohenstein in 1912, the eldest of his three sons, Hereditary Prince August (1868-1947), became 4th Prince of Sayn-Wittgenstein-Hohenstein and head of the third branch of the House of Sayn. Being a childless bachelor, the elder of whose two younger brothers, Georg (1873-1960), had married morganatically, while the younger, Wilhelm (1877-1958), was 49 and yet unmarried, August preserved the name and heritage of his branch of the House of Sayn by adopting Prince Christian Heinrich {Christian Heinrich Prinz zu Sayn-Wittgenstein-Berleburg} (1908-1953) of the Berleburg line. He was the second son of the late head of the entire House of Sayn, Richard, 4th Prince of Sayn-Wittgenstein-Berleburg (1882-1925), whose eldest son Gustav Albrecht, 5th Prince of Sayn-Wittgenstein-Berleburg (1907-1944), had inherited the senior line's fortune and position.

In November 1960, Christian Heinrich, being the divorced father of three daughters by his dynastic marriage to Countess Beatrix von Bismarck-Schönhausen {Beatrix Grafin von Bismarck-Schönhausen} (1921-2006), married Princess Dagmar zu Sayn-Wittgenstein-Hohenstein (1919-2002), elder daughter of his adopted father's younger brother, Georg, who died seven months before the wedding. As Georg's children by his morganatic wife, Marie Rühm, (created Baroness von Freusburg by the reigning Prince of Lippe in 1916) had been de-morganatized by declaration of their uncle August on 11 February 1947, her marriage to Christian Heinrich was deemed a dynastic match, ensuring that their son Bernhart would be born in compliance with the house laws of his adoptive ancestors, the Sayn-Wittgenstein-Hohensteins, while also being a grandson of the last dynastic male of that family, Prince Georg.

== Members ==
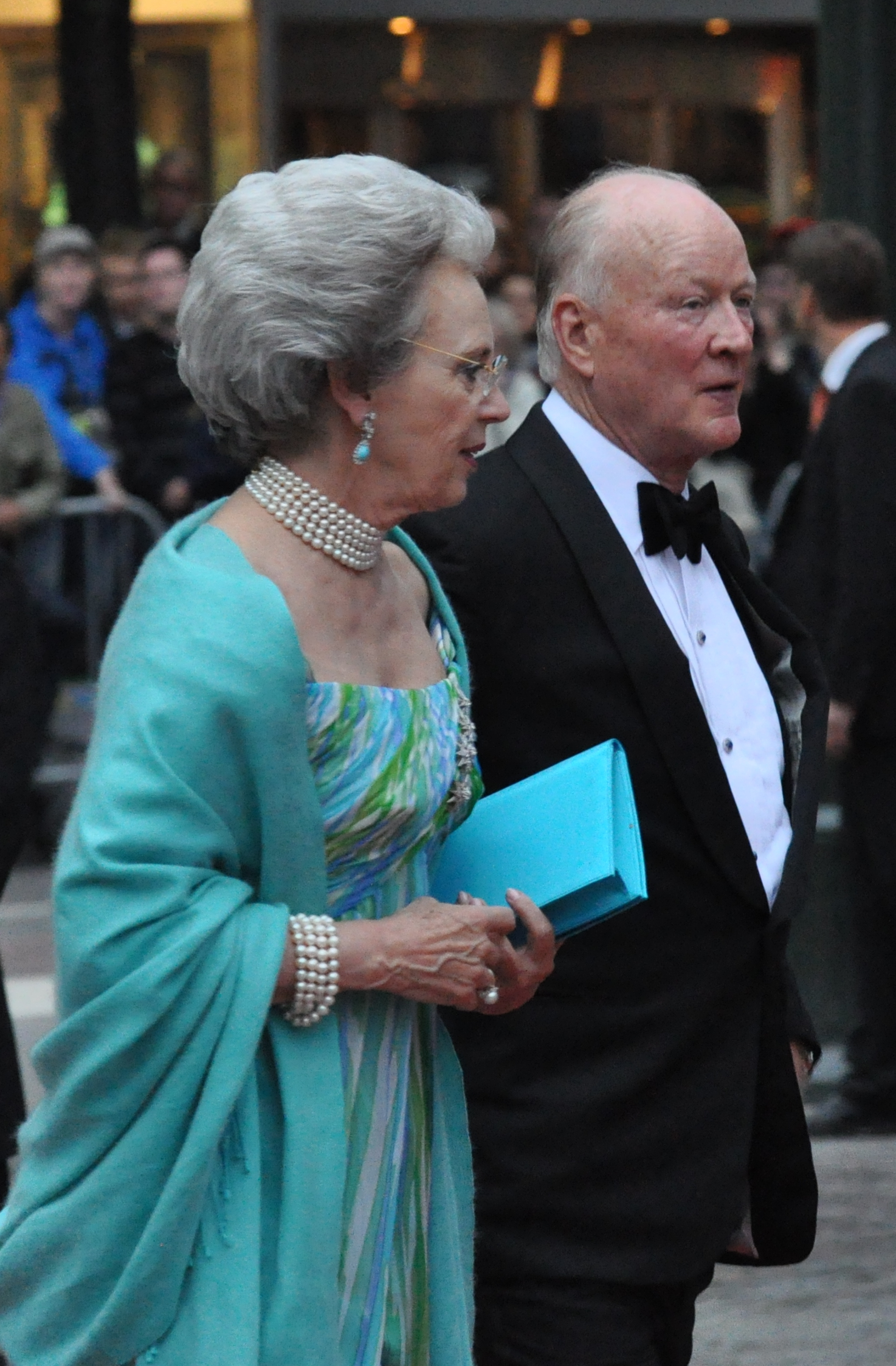
Richard, 6th Prince of Sayn-Wittgenstein-Berleburg and his wife Princess Benedikte of Denmark (2010)

- Richard, 4th Prince of Sayn-Wittgenstein-Berleburg (1882-1925)
  - Gustav Albrecht, 5th Prince of Sayn-Wittgenstein-Berleburg (1907-missing 1944, declared dead 1969)
    - Richard, 6th Prince of Sayn-Wittgenstein-Berleburg (1934-2017)
      - Gustav, 7th Prince of Sayn-Wittgenstein-Berleburg (born 1969)
        - (1) Prince Gustav Albrecht of Sayn-Wittgenstein-Berleburg (born 2023)
        - Princess Mafalda of Sayn-Wittgenstein-Berleburg (born 2024)
      - Princess Alexandra of Sayn-Wittgenstein-Berleburg (born 1970), married twice and has issue
      - Princess Nathalie of Sayn-Wittgenstein-Berleburg (born 1975), divorced and has issue
    - Princess Madeleine of Sayn-Wittgenstein-Berleburg (born 1936), married Otto, 10th Count of Solms-Laubach (1926–1973) and has issue
    - (2) Prince Robin of Sayn-Wittgenstein-Berleburg (born 1938)
      - (3) Prince Sebastian of Sayn-Wittgenstein-Berleburg (born 1971)
        - (4) Prince Ferdinand of Sayn-Wittgenstein-Berleburg (born 2004)
        - Princess Stella of Sayn-Wittgenstein-Berleburg (born 2006)
        - (5) Prince Philipp of Sayn-Wittgenstein-Berleburg (born 2011)
      - Princess Natascha of Sayn-Wittgenstein-Berleburg (born 1973), married and has issue
      - Princess Marie of Sayn-Wittgenstein-Berleburg (born 1980), married and has issue
    - Princess Tatiana of Sayn-Wittgenstein-Berleburg (born 1940), married Moritz, Landgrave of Hesse (1926–2013) and has issue
    - Princess Pia of Sayn-Wittgenstein-Berleburg (1942-2025)
  - Christian-Heinrich, 5th Prince of Sayn-Wittgenstein-Hohenstein (1908-1983)
    - Princess Loretta of Sayn-Wittgenstein-Hohenstein (born 1946), married twice and has issue
    - Princess Johanna of Sayn-Wittgenstein-Hohenstein (born 1948), married thrice and has issue
    - Hereditary Prince Albrecht of Sayn-Wittgenstein-Hohenstein (1950–1953)
    - Princess Madeleine of Sayn-Wittgenstein-Hohenstein (born 1961), married twice and has issue
    - (6) Bernhart, 6th Prince of Sayn-Wittgenstein-Hohenstein (born 1962)
      - (7) Wenzel, Hereditary Prince of Sayn-Wittgenstein-Hohenstein (born 1997)
  - Prince Ludwig Ferdinand of Sayn-Wittgenstein-Berleburg (1910-1943)
    - Princess Marita of Sayn-Wittgenstein-Berleburg (1936–2000), married and had issue
    - Prince Otto Ludwig of Sayn-Wittgenstein-Berleburg (1938–2025)
      - (8) Prince Stanislaus of Sayn-Wittgenstein-Berleburg (born 1965)
        - (9) Prince Friedrich of Sayn-Wittgenstein-Berleburg (born 1996)
        - (10) Prince August of Sayn-Wittgenstein-Berleburg (born 1998)
        - Princess Caroline of Sayn-Wittgenstein-Berleburg (born 2002)
        - Princess Emilia of Sayn-Wittgenstein-Berleburg (born 2005)
      - Princess Stefanie of Sayn-Wittgenstein-Berleburg (born 1966), married and has issue
      - Princess Marie-Louise "Lily" of Sayn-Wittgenstein-Berleburg (born 1972), married twice and has issue
      - Princess Vanessa of Sayn-Wittgenstein-Berleburg (born 1978), married and has issue
      - (11) Prince Maximilian-Alexander of Sayn-Wittgenstein-Berleburg (born 1980)
        - Princess Aurelia of Sayn-Wittgenstein-Berleburg (born 2018)
    - (12) Prince Johann-Stanislaus of Sayn-Wittgenstein-Berleburg (born 1939)
      - (13) Prince Otto-Ludwig of Sayn-Wittgenstein-Berleburg (born 1972)
        - (14) Prince Justus-Casimir of Sayn-Wittgenstein-Berleburg (born 2005)
        - (15) Prince Gustav of Sayn-Wittgenstein-Berleburg (born 2007)
        - Princess Ann-Katrin of Sayn-Wittgenstein-Berleburg (born 2009)
      - Princess Isabelle of Sayn-Wittgenstein-Berleburg (born 1974), married and has issue
      - (16) Prince Constantin of Sayn-Wittgenstein-Berleburg (born 1978)
        - Princess Margareta of Sayn-Wittgenstein-Berleburg (born 2016)
    - (17) Prince Ludwig Ferdinand of Sayn-Wittgenstein-Berleburg (born 1942)
      - (18) Prince Carl Albrecht of Sayn-Wittgenstein-Berleburg (born 1976)
        - (19) Prince Salentin of Sayn-Wittgenstein-Berleburg (born 2014)
        - Princess Annabelle of Sayn-Wittgenstein-Berleburg (born 2016)
      - Princess Anna of Sayn-Wittgenstein-Berleburg (born 1978), married Prince Manuel of Bavaria and has issue
      - (20) Prince August-Frederik of Sayn-Wittgenstein-Berleburg (born 1981)
      - Princess Theodora of Sayn-Wittgenstein-Berleburg (born 1986)
    - Princess Ulrike-Christine of Sayn-Wittgenstein-Berleburg (1944–2021), married and had issue
