= Naten =

Lake in Södermanland, Sweden

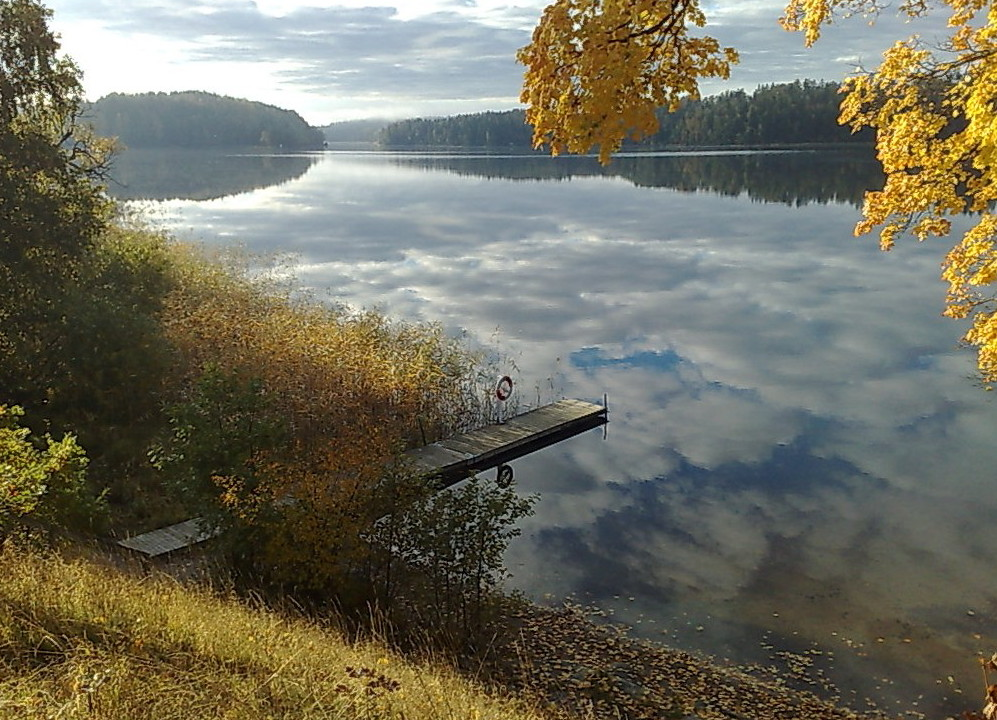

- Location within Södermanland Location within Sweden
- Coordinates: 59°04′N 17°00′E
- Basin countries: Sweden

Naten is a lake in the Gnesta municipality of Södermanland, Sweden. It is part of the main drainage of the Nyköpingsån river. The lake has an area of 1.07 square kilometers and is 21.2 meters above sea level. The lake is drained by the Husbyån (Jättnaån) stream.
