= Elghammar Castle =

Villa in Södermanland County, Sweden

Elghammar
- Gnesta Municipality, Sweden
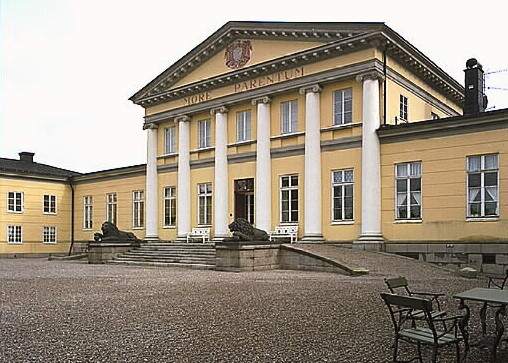

Site information
- Type: Castle
- Owner: Christina d'Otrante

Location
- Coordinates: 59°03′22″N 17°04′51″E

Site history
- Built by: Curt von Stedingk

Elghammar is a house in Södermanland County, Sweden 80km southwest of Stockholm built at the end of the lake Lockvattnet.

The castle—or manor/Italian villa as the owner, the Duchess Christina d'Otrante (wife of Gustaf Douglas Armand Fouché d'Otrante, 7th Duc d'Otrante), preferred it to be perceived—is surrounded by forests and a farm.

== History ==
Initially owned by the Kruse family of Elghammar, then by Johan Adolf Welander, the existing manor house was sold in 1807 to Marshall Curt von Stedingk, who ordered new constructions in the French Empire style.

His son died in 1875 and the property was inherited by a Baroness Theresa von Stedingk, who married her cousin the 5th Duke of Otrante (the duke had as an ancestor Joseph Fouché, who was the French Minister of Police during the reign of Emperor Napoleon). The Duke's mother was Baroness Adelaide (or Amélie) von Stedingk who had married the 4th Duke and was the cousin of Theresa.

Christina d'Otrante died at the age of 83 and it was inherited by Charles-Louis Fouché d'Otrante, the 8th Duke.

== General References ==
- "Fouché d'Otrante: French Neapolitan dukes in Sweden". Dukes and Princes. 2022-03-12.
