= Gimmersta =

- Location within Stockholm Location within Sweden
- Coordinates: 59°14′N 18°17′E
- Country: Sweden
- Province: Södermanland
- County: Stockholm County
- Municipality: Tyresö Municipality

Area
  - Total: 0.32 km^{2} (0.12 sq mi)

Population (31 December 2010)
  - Total: 354
  - Density: 1,115/km^{2} (2,890/sq mi)
- Time zone: UTC+1 (CET)
  - Summer (DST): UTC+2 (CEST)

Gimmersta is a locality situated in Tyresö Municipality, Stockholm County, Sweden with 354 inhabitants in 2010.
