= Theodora Sayn-Wittgenstein =

German aristocrat (born 1986)

Princess Theodora
- Countess Nikolaus Bethlen de Bethlen
- Born: 29 December 1986 (age 39); Marburg, Hesse, West Germany
- Spouse: Count Nikolaus Bethlen de Bethlen (m. 2018)
Names
- German: Theodora-Louise Victoria Juliana Yvonne Prinzessin zu Sayn-Wittgenstein-Berleburg
- House: Sayn-Wittgenstein-Berleburg (by birth); Bethlen (by marriage)
- Father: Prince Ludwig Ferdinand of Sayn-Wittgenstein-Berleburg
- Mother: Countess Yvonne Wachtmeister af Johannishus

Princess Theodora zu Sayn-Wittgenstein-Berleburg (Theodora-Louise Victoria Juliana Yvonne; born 29 December 1986) is a German aristocrat and international relations professional. After completing a degree in international relations from the University of St Andrews in 2011, she worked in Jordan for a green energy firm owned by her father, Prince Ludwig Ferdinand zu Sayn Wittgenstein-Berleburg.

In 2014, Wittgenstein was arrested in Scotland and charged with breaching of the peace aggravated by religious prejudice, two counts of physical assault, and an offense under the 2012 Police and Fire Reform Act after she took off her clothes, made racist, homophobic, and anti-Muslim remarks, and physically assaulted two security personnel during an Oktoberfest party. She was fined £1,000 by Dundee Sheriff Court. In 2020, her family used the European Union's Right to be forgotten law to have Google remove 197 links from their search engine in Germany that led to articles about her arrest.

== Early life and family ==
Wittgenstein was born on 29 January 1986 in Marburg and is a member of the House of Sayn-Wittgenstein-Berleburg, an old German noble family. She is the daughter of Prince Ludwig Ferdinand zu Sayn-Wittgenstein-Berleburg and Countess Yvonne Wachtmeister af Johannishus, a member of the Swedish nobility. Her paternal grandparents were Prince Ludwig Ferdinand of Sayn-Wittgenstein-Berleburg and Princess Friederike Juliane of Salm-Horstmar. She is a great-granddaughter of Richard, 4th Prince of Sayn-Wittgenstein-Berleburg and Princess Madeleine of Löwenstein-Wertheim-Freudenberg. Wittgenstein is the younger sister of the journalist and writer Anna von Bayern, Prince Carl Albrecht zu Sayn-Wittgenstein and the actor August Wittgenstein.

== Education and career ==
Wittgenstein was educated at boarding schools in Switzerland and the United Kingdom. She attended the University of St Andrews, where she earned a degree in international relations in 2011. She lived in Jordan while working for her father's green energy firm.

== Personal life ==
On 21 July 2018, she married Count Miklós "Nikolaus" Bálint Béla Bethelen de Bethlen in a ceremony in Bad Laasphe, North Rhine-Westphalia. She and her husband live on a property at Schloss Berleburg, her childhood home.

=== Anti-Islam incident and arrest ===
In March 2014, Wittgenstein was arrested after taking her clothes off, making homophobic remarks, yelling racial slurs, and making anti-Muslim remarks towards Farah Jasmin Hussain, a first aid responder, at an Oktoberfest party for University of St Andrews students at Kinkell Byre. She was put in leg restraints by police due to her aggressive behavior after she physically assaulted two members of staff. She was taken into police custody and held for two days.

Wittgenstein was fined £1,000 by Sheriff Mark Steward of the Dundee Sheriff Court. She admitted to one charge of breach of the peace aggravated by religious prejudice, two counts of assault, and an offence under the 2012 Police and Fire Reform Act. Wittgentstein's solicitor, Douglas Williams, said that she has a thyroid condition which may have contributed to her behavior.

In 2020, the House of Sayn-Wittgenstein-Berleburg tried to make online reports of Wittgenstein's arrest disappear via the European Union's Right to be forgotten law. Google removed nearly 200 links from its search engine about Wittgenstein's behavior at the Oktoberfest party and her arrest and fine. The incident raised questions about who has the "right to be forgotten" by law. In Google's bi-annual Transparency Report, where the company shares data about how governments and corporations make requests to the company, an entry in Germany was listed that included a "lawyer's removal request from a member of a German noble family" who was "prosecuted following a drunken night out in Scotland." As an outcome of the request, Google removed 197 links following a preliminary injunction against a third party that the identifying content is illegitimate.
