= Träskaten =

Lake in Eskilstuna Municipality, Sweden

- Location within Södermanland
- Coordinates: 59°15′06″N 16°50′36″E
- Basin countries: Sweden

Träskaten is a lake of Södermanland, Sweden.
