= Orrhammaren =

Lake in Södermanland, Sweden

- Location within Södermanland
- Coordinates: 59°05′N 16°34′E
- Basin countries: Sweden

Orrhammaren is a lake in Södermanland, Sweden.
