= Klämmingen =

Lake in Sweden

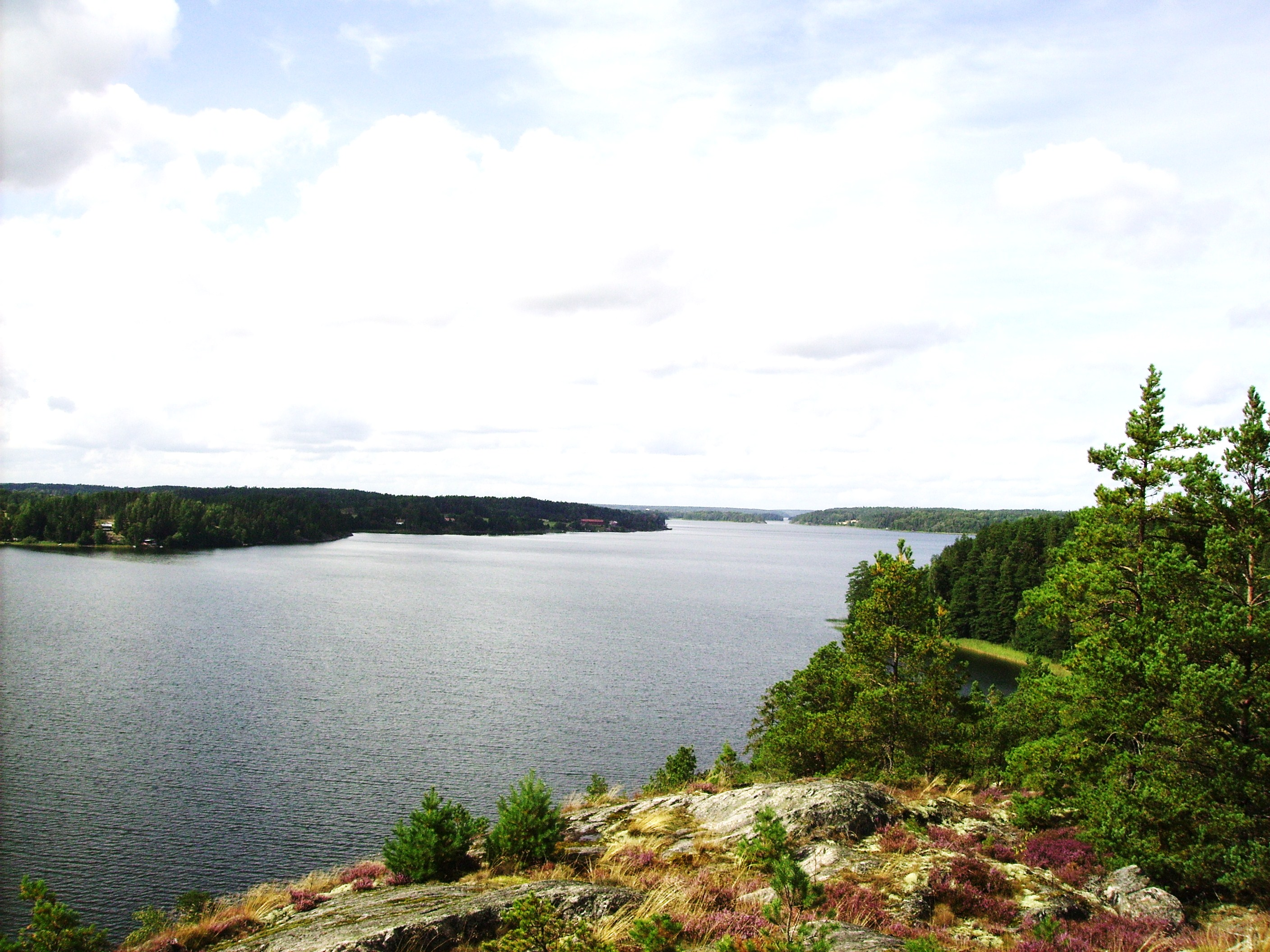

- Location within Södermanland
- Coordinates: 59°07′N 17°15′E
- Basin countries: Sweden

Klämmingen is a lake in Södermanland, Sweden.
