= Princess Theodora of Greece and Denmark =

Princess Theodora of Greece and Denmark may refer to:

- Princess Theodora of Greece and Denmark (1906–1969), the older sister of Prince Philip, Duke of Edinburgh
- Princess Theodora of Greece and Denmark (born 1983), the youngest daughter of former King Constantine II of Greece and Queen Anne-Marie of Greece
