= Prince Ludwig Ferdinand of Sayn-Wittgenstein-Berleburg =

- Born: 4 April 1910; Berleburg Castle, Germany
- Died: 22 November 1943 (aged 33); Zhytomyr, Ukrainian SSR, Soviet Union
- Military career
- Allegiance: Weimar Republic (until 1933); Nazi Germany(from 1933)
- Branch: Army
- Service years: 1930–43
- Rank: Oberst (Posthumously)
- Commands: Kavallerie-Regiment Süd
- Conflicts: World War II: Invasion of Poland; Battle of France; Operation Barbarossa; Battle of Smolensk (1941); Battle of Moscow; Battle of Kursk; Battle of Kiev (1943)
- Awards: Knight's Cross of the Iron Cross

Prinz Ludwig Ferdinand Paul Franz Stanislaus Ulrich Otto Ludolf zu Sayn-Wittgenstein-Berleburg (4 April 1910 – 22 November 1943) was a highly decorated Oberst in the Wehrmacht during World War II. He was also a recipient of the Knight's Cross of the Iron Cross. Ludwig-Ferdinand Prinz von Sayn-Wittgenstein-Berleburg was killed on 22 November 1943 near Zhytomyr, Ukraine. He was posthumously awarded the Knight's Cross on 20 January 1944 and was also promoted to Oberst.

== Early life ==
Ludwig was the son of Richard, 4th Prince of Sayn-Wittgenstein-Berleburg and Princess Madeleine of Löwenstein-Wertheim-Freudenberg. He had two older brothers, Gustav Albrecht who was also killed in 1944, and Christian Heinrich who died in 1983. Gustav's son Richard was married to Princess Benedikte of Denmark, sister of Queen Margrethe II and of former Queen Anne-Marie of Greece.

== Personal life ==
Ludwig Ferdinand married in 1935 Princess Friederike Juliane of Salm-Horstmar, daughter of Otto II, Prince of Salm-Horstmar (1867-1941) and Countess Rosa of Solms-Baruth (1884-1945). They had five children:

- Marita, Princess zu Sayn-Wittgenstein-Berleburg (1936-2000), married Count Ulrich Wolf Adolf Grote (b.1940); had issue
- Otto-Ludwig, Prince zu Sayn-Wittgenstein-Berleburg (1938-2025), married Baroness Anette von Cramm (b.1944); had issue
- Johann-Stanislaus, Prince zu Sayn-Wittgenstein-Berleburg (b.1939), married Almut Leonhards (b.1943); had issue
- Ludwig-Ferdinand, Prince zu Sayn-Wittgenstein-Berleburg (b.1942), married Countess Yvonne Wachtmeister af Johannishus (b.1951); had issue
- Ulrike-Christine, Princess zu Sayn-Wittgenstein-Berleburg (1944-2021), married Hano von Wulffen (b.1940); had issue

His descendants include Ludwig-Ferdinand's children Princess Anna of Bavaria, Prince August Fredrik zu Sayn-Wittgenstein-Berleburg, and Theodora Sayn-Wittgenstein.

== Awards and decorations ==
- Iron Cross (1939)
  - 2nd Class (20 May 1940)
  - 1st Class (10 June 1940)
- Eastern Front Medal
- German Cross in Gold (15 December 1941)
- Knight's Cross of the Iron Cross on 20 January 1944 as Oberstleutnant and commander of Kavallerie-Regiment Süd

Military offices
Preceded by None	Commander of Kavallerie-Regiment Süd; 1 June 1943 – 22 November 1943	Succeeded by Major Hans-Jobst Rojahn
