= Björnlunda =

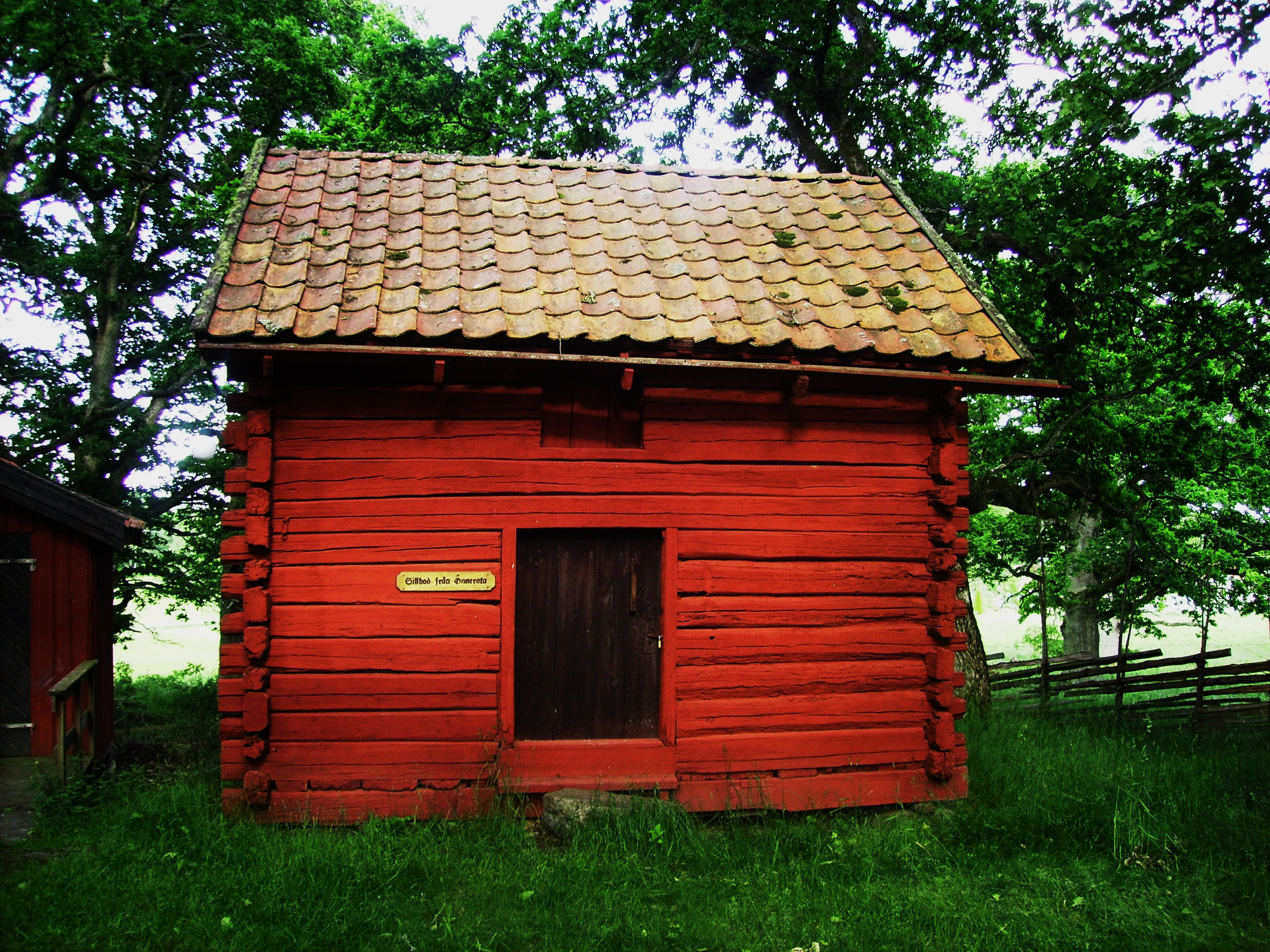
- Björnlunda hembygdsgård

- Location within Södermanland Location within Sweden
- Coordinates: 59°04′N 17°09′E
- Country: Sweden
- Province: Södermanland
- County: Södermanland County
- Municipality: Gnesta Municipality

Area
  - Total: 0.86 km^{2} (0.33 sq mi)

Population (31 December 2020)
  - Total: 830
  - Density: 970/km^{2} (2,500/sq mi)
- Time zone: UTC+1 (CET)
  - Summer (DST): UTC+2 (CEST)
- Climate: Dfb

Björnlunda is a locality situated in Gnesta Municipality, Södermanland County, Sweden, which had a population of 827 inhabitants in 2010. Björnlunda is located between the city of Södertälje and the city of Katrineholm and close to halfway between Strängnäs and Nyköping in a north–south direction.

== History ==
The earliest citation for Björnlunda is in a document dating from around 1314 in which the settlement is called "Biornlundum". However, traces of Viking-era settlement and Iron Age burial sites have been found in the area.

For a long time the nearby village of Önnersta was the main settlement in the area, as it lay on the route used by Swedish monarchs travelling between Gripsholm Castle and Nyköpingshus. However, the establishment of a railway line between Stockholm and Gothenburg in 1862 led to a gradual drift of markets and population to the area nearest the new railway station in Björnlunda, which became the dominant settlement in the area.

== Riksdag elections ==
Year	%	Votes	V	S	MP	C	L	KD	M	SD	NyD	Left	Right
1973	89.4	668	3.4	34.3		40.1	8.5	1.3	10.9			37.7	59.6
1976	88.7	771	3.5	32.9		39.4	8.0	1.2	14.5			36.4	62.0
1979	86.4	771	3.4	36.1		33.5	8.9	0.6	17.3			39.4	59.7
1982	85.6	785	3.3	35.9	3.7	25.7	4.6	1.3	25.4			39.2	55.7
1985	87.5	827	3.6	32.8	2.9	20.8	14.4		25.3			36.4	60.5
1988	85.0	776	4.4	32.7	6.1	20.6	11.3	2.4	22.3			43.2	54.3
1991	88.4	846	3.8	31.1	4.5	17.0	8.7	4.8	19.6		9.3	34.9	50.2
1994	86.8	858	6.0	36.3	6.9	16.7	6.2	3.6	21.3		1.1	49.2	47.8
1998	80.2	787	8.9	31.4	6.0	14.2	4.3	13.2	20.6			46.3	52.4
2002	81.1	821	8.9	32.2	6.1	14.9	11.1	11.3	13.2	1.1		47.1	50.4
2006	82.3	836	4.3	29.7	6.5	13.6	5.4	6.6	28.8	3.3		40.4	54.4
2010	82.8	896	4.8	23.0	7.8	11.5	6.0	3.8	33.6	7.8		35.6	54.9
2014	86.6	923	5.3	25.2	6.0	11.5	3.9	3.5	25.7	15.1		36.5	44.5
2018	85.7	913	8.8	23.2	3.8	14.0	3.7	5.3	18.9	20.6		49.8	48.5

== Attractions ==
Jägerdals Gård, Haversjön, The local museum, Dagnäsön, Björnlunda Church, Öster Malma, Laxne, Krampan, Skottvångs gruva, Näsberget, Jätkyrkan, Kyrksjön, Kleva kvarn.
