= Södermanland =

Historical province of Sweden

Södermanland Sörmland
- Historical province
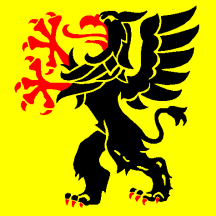
- Flag Coat of arms

- Coordinates: 59°N 17°E
- Country: Sweden
- Land: Svealand
- Counties: Södermanland County; Stockholm County

Area
  - Total: 8,169 km^{2} (3,154 sq mi)

Population (31 December 2023)
  - Total: 1,407,887
  - Density: 172.3/km^{2} (446.4/sq mi)

Ethnicity
  - Languages: Svealand Swedish; Sörmländska; Stockholmska

Culture
  - Flower: White water lily
  - Animal: Osprey
  - Bird: —
  - Fish: Bream
- Time zone: UTC+1 (CET)
  - Summer (DST): UTC+2 (CEST)

Södermanland (Swedish pronunciation: [ˈsø̂ːdɛrmanˌland] or [ˈsø̌ː-]), locally Sörmland, sometimes referred to under its Latinized form Sudermannia or Sudermania, is a historical province (or landskap) on the south eastern coast of Sweden. It borders Östergötland, Närke, Västmanland and Uppland. It is also bounded by lake Mälaren and the Baltic Sea.

Södermanland means "(The) Land of the Southern Men", where the "southern men" (södermännen) were the people living south of Uppland.

== Administration ==
The traditional provinces of Sweden serve no administrative or political purposes, but are historical and cultural entities. There is a corresponding administrative Södermanland County. However, the bulk of the population is within Stockholm County.

== Heraldry ==
The coat of arms was granted in 1560. The arms is represented with a ducal coronet. Blazon: "Or, a Griffin rampant Sable beaked, langued, membered and armed Gules." The same CoA was granted for the county in 1940.

== Geography ==
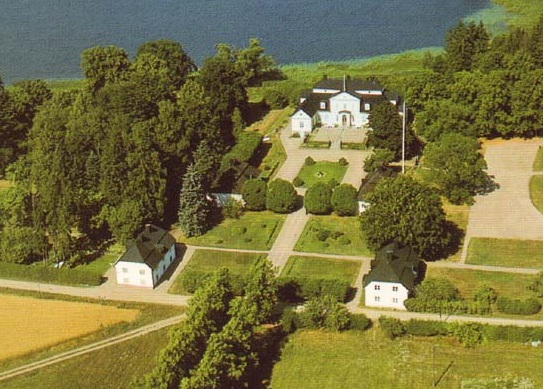
The cultural landscape of Södermanland is characterised by its many manor houses. Pictured: Danbyholm Manor

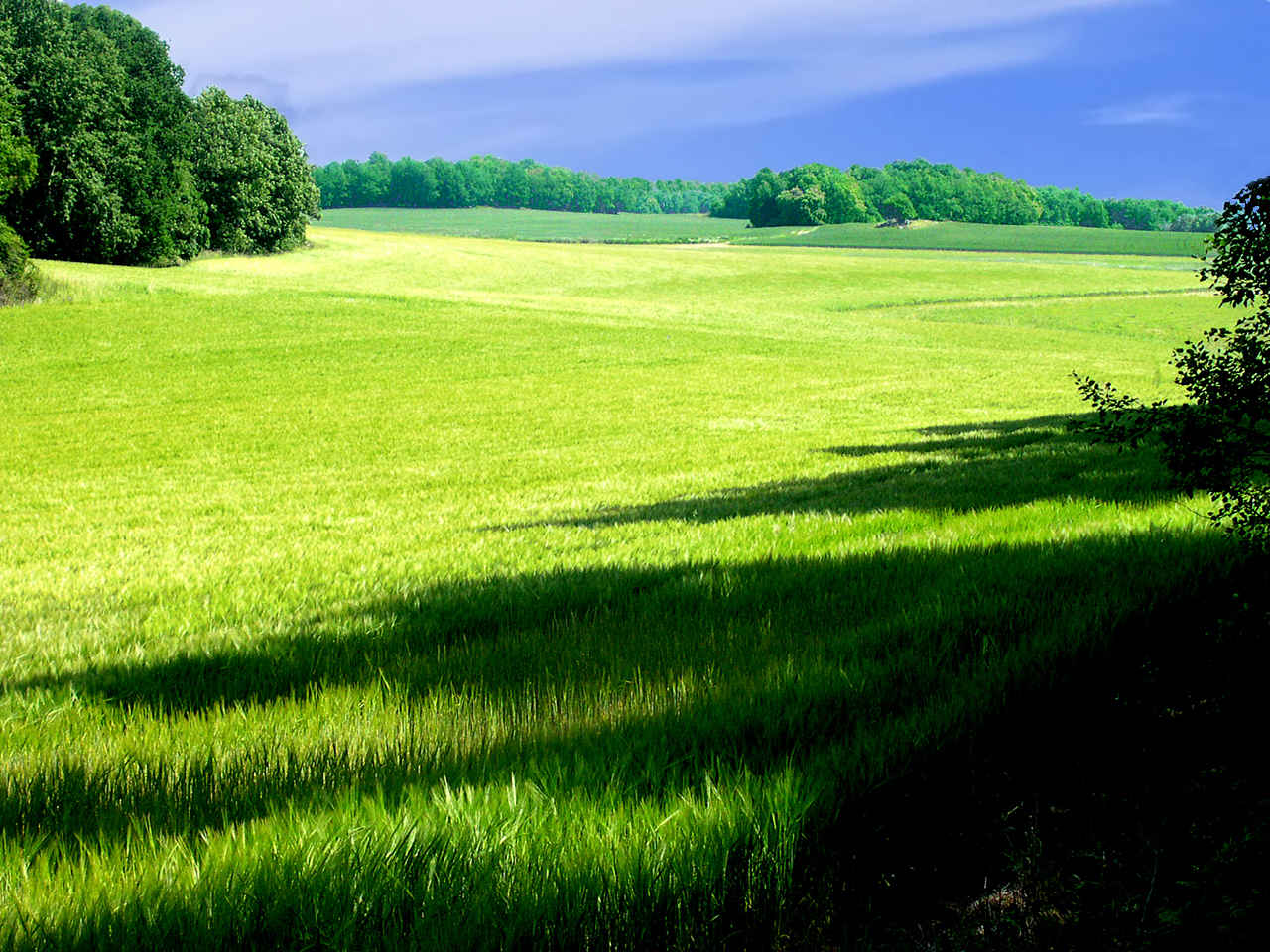
Landscape in Södermanland.

Södermanland is situated between lake Mälaren to the north and the Baltic Sea to the south and east. In the south, the border to Östergötland is comprised by the Kolmården forest.

The terrain is flat, with its highest altitude being Skogsbyås at 124 m (407 ft) elevation. The terrain largely consists of water filled hollows covered with woods on the heights.

There are three major water regions. One in the west, where lake Hjälmaren drains into Mälaren. There is a second water region on Södertörn, which is rather small in size and has no larger lakes. Smaller lakes in that region include Bornsjön (6.5 km^{2} (2.5 sq mi)), Orlången (2.5 km^{2} (0.97 sq mi)), and Magelungen (2.9 km^{2} (1.1 sq mi)) as well as Naten lake. The third region is to the south towards Kolmården.

Both the city of Stockholm and Stockholm County are divided in the middle between Södermanland (southern part) and Uppland (northern part).

- National parks: Tyresta

=== Lakes ===
- Klämmingen
- Kolsnaren
- Likstammen
- Lockvattnet
- Näsnaren
- Orrhammaren
- Tornbergssjön
- Träskaten
- Visnaren

== Population ==
The population of Södermanland is 1,320,477 as of 31 December 2016. It is distributed over three counties as follows:

County	Population
part of Stockholm County	1,025,392
entire Södermanland County	288,097
part of Västmanland County	6,988

Södermanland is, with 160 inhabitants per square kilometre (410/sq mi), the most densely populated of the provinces. A great part of Stockholm urban area is situated within its limits.

== History ==
Södermanland is one of the ancient Swedish provinces. People probably settled there in the early Stone Age, from which time the earliest remains date. There are a total of 96,000 known ancient remains such as grave fields, coins, knives, etc. There are prominent finds especially from the Neolithic, but also a substantial amount from the Nordic Bronze Age. From the early Iron Age, before 1 AD, the finds are however more sparse. Then from the 5th and 6th centuries AD, the finds are again plenty, now of gold. In 1774, a treasure of 12 kg (26 lb) of gold from that time was found on a farm in Tureholm.

From the Viking Age 300 runestones remain, second only to Uppland in quantity. The oldest, which is dated from the late 6th century, is the Skåäng Runestone.

The earliest recorded history is generally of the legendary kind. Before the 7th century it is deemed to have been governed by petty kingdoms. This period ended when Ingjald the Ill-Ruler allegedly had a number of local rulers arsoned around 640.

Nyköping has remnants of city structures in the archeological record from around 600. The excavated remnants if buildings were of several types with boat houses for longboats, according to the excavations 2010–2011 at Åkroken 3 (Report 2016:77). The boat houses were in use for about 400 years, during Vendel era and Viking age.

The oldest city with the historical city status in Södermanland was Södertälje, a privilege granted around 1000. Nyköping received the privilege in 1187. In the 13th century, Stockholm was granted the privilege; in the 14th century followed by Strängnäs, Torshälla and Trosa.

Around 1100, Strängnäs became the episcopal seat with a bishop and cathedral. It was for a long time the only diocese of the province. In 1942 the Diocese of Stockholm was established, claiming parts of the Strängnäs territory.

The first affirmative records date from the 13th century. King Magnus Ladulås was given the province in 1266, and settled himself on the manor at Nyköping. Nyköping became one of the most important cities in Sweden. In 1317, Nyköping become the location of the infamous Nyköping Banquet where King Birger had both his brothers murdered to take possession of the crown and avenge earlier wrong-deeds.

In 1523, King Gustav Vasa, referred to as Sweden's Father of the Nation, was elected in Strängnäs. The date of his election, 6 June, is commemorated as the national holiday. Charles IX, a son of Gustav Vasa, favoured the province, fortifying castles and establishing early industries.

The largest of many paintings made by David von Krafft is the Hildebrand family portrait from 1713 (at Nynäs Manor, in Södermanland), depicting the merchant and industrialist Henrik Jacob Hildebrand and his wife Anna Sofia Amya on the occasion of their 50th anniversary surrounded by their over twenty children and grandchildren, as well as some deceased relatives in paintings on the wall in the background.

=== Dukes and Duchesses of Södermanland ===
- Prince Magnus (as of 1252; king from 1275)
- Prince Eric (1302–1310 – also Dalsland, North Halland, Värmland and West Gothland)
- Prince Carl (as of 1560; king from 1604 – also Närke and Värmland)
  - Princess Maria, his first wife (1579–1589 – also Närke and Värmland)
  - Princess Christina, his second wife and widow (as of 1592; queen from 1604 – also Närke and Värmland)
- Crown Prince Gustav Adolph (1604–1607 – also Västmanland)
- Prince Carl Philip (1607–1618 – also Närke and Värmland)
- Prince Carl (as of 1772; king from 1809)
  - Princess Charlotte, his wife and widow (as of 1774; queen from 1809)
- Crown Prince Oscar (as of 1811; king from 1844)
  - Crown Princess Josephine, his wife and widow (as of 1823; queen from 1844)
- Prince Carl Oscar (1852–1854)
- Prince Wilhelm (1884–1965)
  - Princess Maria, his wife (1909 until divorce 1914)
- Prince Alexander (2016–present)

== Culture ==
The area has been inhabited since the Stone Age, and medieval churches, runestones and graveyards are plentiful throughout the countryside.

Of buildings, the arguably most impressive is the castle of Gripsholm. Nearby is the Gripsholm Runestone, a typical Viking Runestone, commemorating an earlier Viking expedition.

The cemetery Skogskyrkogården in southern Stockholm is a UNESCO World Heritage Site.

== Sub-divisions ==
Södermanland was historically divided into chartered cities and into hundreds.

=== Cities (year city rights were granted) ===
- Eskilstuna (1659)
- Flen (1949)
- Katrineholm (1917)
- Mariefred (1605)
- Nacka (1949)
- Nyköping (1187)
- Nynäshamn (1946)
- Oxelösund (1950)
- Stockholm (1250)
- Strängnäs (1336)
- Södertälje (approximately 1000)
- Torshälla (1317)
- Trosa (approximately 1300)

=== Hundreds ===
- Asker Hundred
- Daga Hundred
- Hölebo Hundred
- Jönåker Hundred
- Oppunda Hundred
- Rönö Hundred
- Selebo Hundred
- Sotholm Hundred
- Svartlösa Hundred
- Villåttinge Hundred
- Västerrekarne Hundred
- Åkerbo Hundred
- Åker Hundred
- Öknebo Hundred
- Österrekarne Hundred

== Sports ==
Football in the province is administered by Södermanlands Fotbollförbund. Ice hockey is also popular, with Södertälje SK.
