= Gustav Albrecht, 5th Prince of Sayn-Wittgenstein-Berleburg =

5th Prince of Sayn-Wittgenstein-Berleburg

Gustav Albrecht
- 5th Prince of Sayn-Wittgenstein-Berleburg

Prince of Sayn-Wittgenstein-Berleburg
- Reign: 1918–1944
- Predecessor: Richard, 4th Prince of Sayn-Wittgenstein-Berleburg
- Successor: Richard, 6th Prince of Sayn-Wittgenstein-Berleburg
- Born: 28 February 1907
- Died: June 1944 (aged 37) (MIA); 29 November 1969 (aged 62) (Declared dead); Orsha, Byelorussia
- Spouse: Margareta Fouché d'Otrante (m. 1934)
- Issue Detail: Prince Richard; Princess Madeleine; Prince Robin; Princess Tatiana; Princess Pia
- House: Sayn-Wittgenstein-Berleburg
- Father: Richard, 4th Prince of Sayn-Wittgenstein-Berleburg
- Mother: Princess Madeleine zu Löwenstein-Wertheim-Freudenberg

Gustav Albrecht, 5th Prince of Sayn-Wittgenstein-Berleburg (Gustav Albrecht Alfred Franz Friedrich Otto Emil Ernst; 28 February 1907 – 1944) was prince and head of the House of Sayn-Wittgenstein. He was the son of Richard, 4th Prince of Sayn-Wittgenstein-Berleburg.

== Personal life ==
Prince Gustav Albrecht Alfred Franz Friedrich Otto Emil Ernst was born on 28 February 1907 at Berleburg, Germany. He married Margareta Fouché d'Otrante (28 March 1909 – 25 August 2005), daughter of Charles Fouché, 6th Duc d'Otrante, on 26 January 1934 at Björnlunda, Södermanland Län, Sweden.

In June 1944, he was serving as an officer in the German Army during the campaign against the Soviet Union. After disappearing during a mission near the Belarusian city of Orsha, Gustav Albrecht was declared missing in action. His family did not seek to have him declared dead until after the birth of his grandson and eventual heir, Prince Gustav on 12 January 1969, and 29 November 1969 is listed as the official date of death for Gustav Albrecht.

He is alternately known as Gustav Albrecht Prinz zu Sayn-Wittgenstein-Berleburg.

== Military service honours ==
Prince Gustav Albrecht served in the German Army in the rank of field officer/field-grade officer (Ic-Stabsoffizier) with the title of Rittmeister der Reserve in the 23rd Panzer-Division. Nearly two months after his disappearance during Operation Bagration in June 1944, he was awarded the German Cross in Silver (Kriegsorden des Deutschen Kreuzes in Silber) on 18 August 1944. Additionally, he was awarded the War Merit Cross first class with swords (Kriegsverdienstkreuz 1. Klasse mit Schwertern), also known as the KVK 1, which was instituted on 18 October 1939 by Hitler; the date of the honour is not known.

== Children ==
- Richard, 6th Prince of Sayn-Wittgenstein-Berleburg (29 October 1934 – 13 March 2017) married Princess Benedikte of Denmark on 3 February 1968, and they have issue.
- Princess Madeleine of Sayn-Wittgenstein-Berleburg (22 April 1936) married Otto, Count zu Solms-Laubach, on 29 July 1958, and they have issue.
- Prince Robin of Sayn-Wittgenstein-Berleburg (29 January 1938) wed, firstly, Birgitta af Klercker on 29 January 1970 (divorced 4 October 1979); on 29 November 1979 he wed, secondly, Marie-Christine Heftler-Louiche, and they have issue.
- Princess Tatiana of Sayn-Wittgenstein-Berleburg (31 July 1940) married Moritz, Landgrave of Hesse on 3 June 1964 (divorced 16 October 1974), and they have issue, including Mafalda von Hessen and Donatus, Landgrave of Hesse.
- Princess Pia of Sayn-Wittgenstein-Berleburg (8 December 1942 – November 2025).

== See also ==
- List of people who disappeared mysteriously: 1910–1990

== Notes ==
Gustav Albrecht, 5th Prince of Sayn-Wittgenstein-Berleburg House of Sayn-Wittgenstein-Berleburg Born: 1907 Died: 1969
Titles in pretence
Preceded by Richard	— TITULAR — Prince of Sayn-Wittgenstein-Berleburg; 1925–1969; Reason for succession failure: German Revolution of 1918-19	Succeeded by Richard
