= Richard, 4th Prince of Sayn-Wittgenstein-Berleburg =

Richard
- 4th Prince of Sayn-Wittgenstein-Berleburg
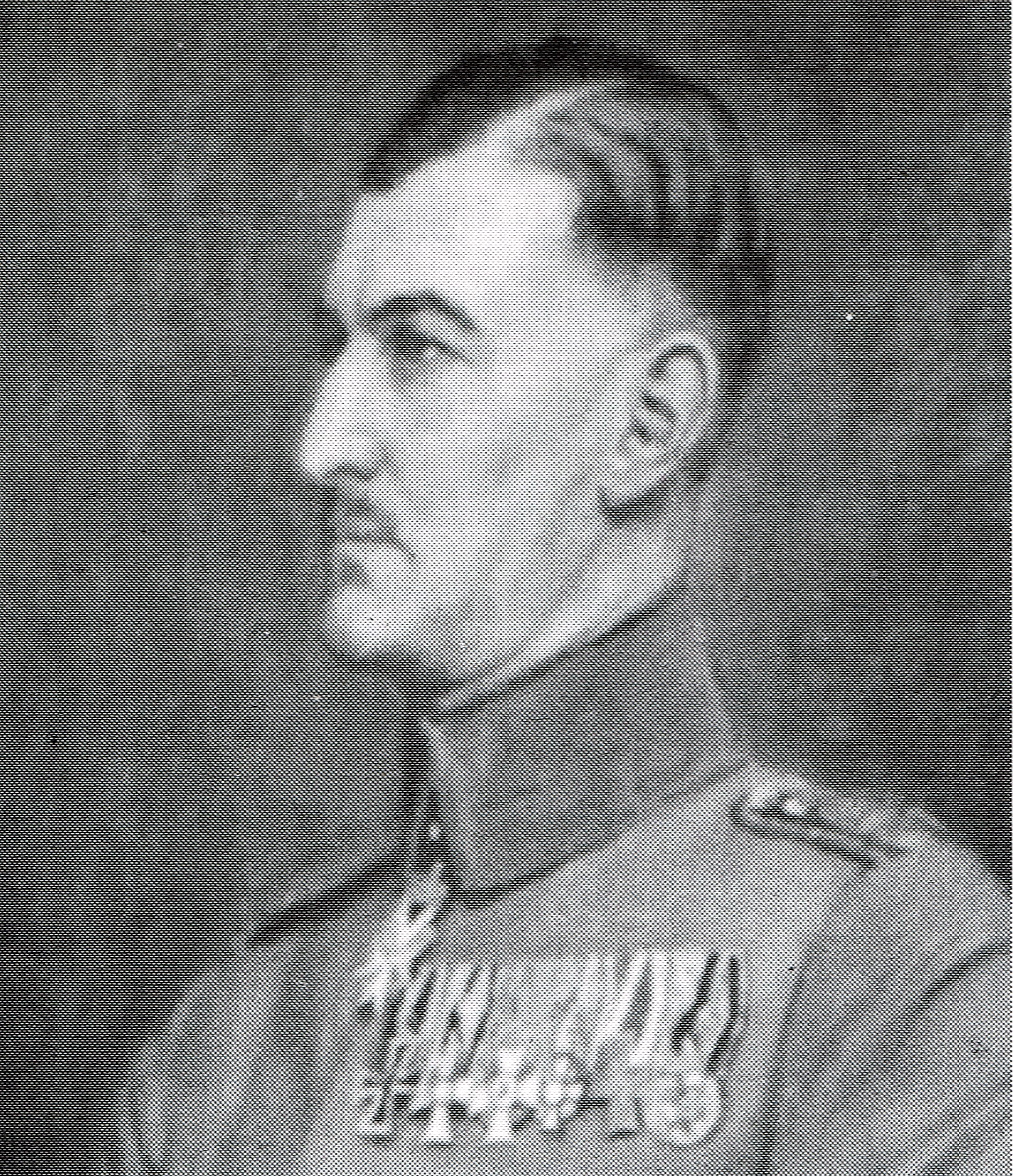

Prince of Sayn-Wittgenstein-Berleburg
- Reign: 1904 – 1918
- Predecessor: Albrecht, 3rd Prince of Sayn-Wittgenstein-Berleburg
- Successor: Gustav Albrecht, 5th Prince of Sayn-Wittgenstein-Berleburg
- Born: 27 May 1882; Berleburg, Germany
- Died: 25 April 1925 (aged 42); Hanau, Germany
- Spouse: Princess Madeleine of Löwenstein-Wertheim-Freudenberg (m. 1902)
- Issue: Gustav Albrecht, 5th Prince of Sayn-Wittgenstein-Berleburg; Christian Heinrich, 5th Prince of Sayn-Wittgenstein-Hohenstein; Prince Ludwig Ferdinand
Names
- Richard Hermann Gustav
- Father: Gustav of Sayn-Wittgenstein-Berleburg
- Mother: Baroness Marie von Gemmingen-Hornberg

Richard, 4th Prince of Sayn-Wittgenstein-Berleburg (German: Richard Hermann Gustav zu Sayn-Wittgenstein-Berleburg, 27 May 1882 – 25 April 1925) was Prince of Sayn-Wittgenstein-Berleburg from 1904 to 1918.

== Life ==
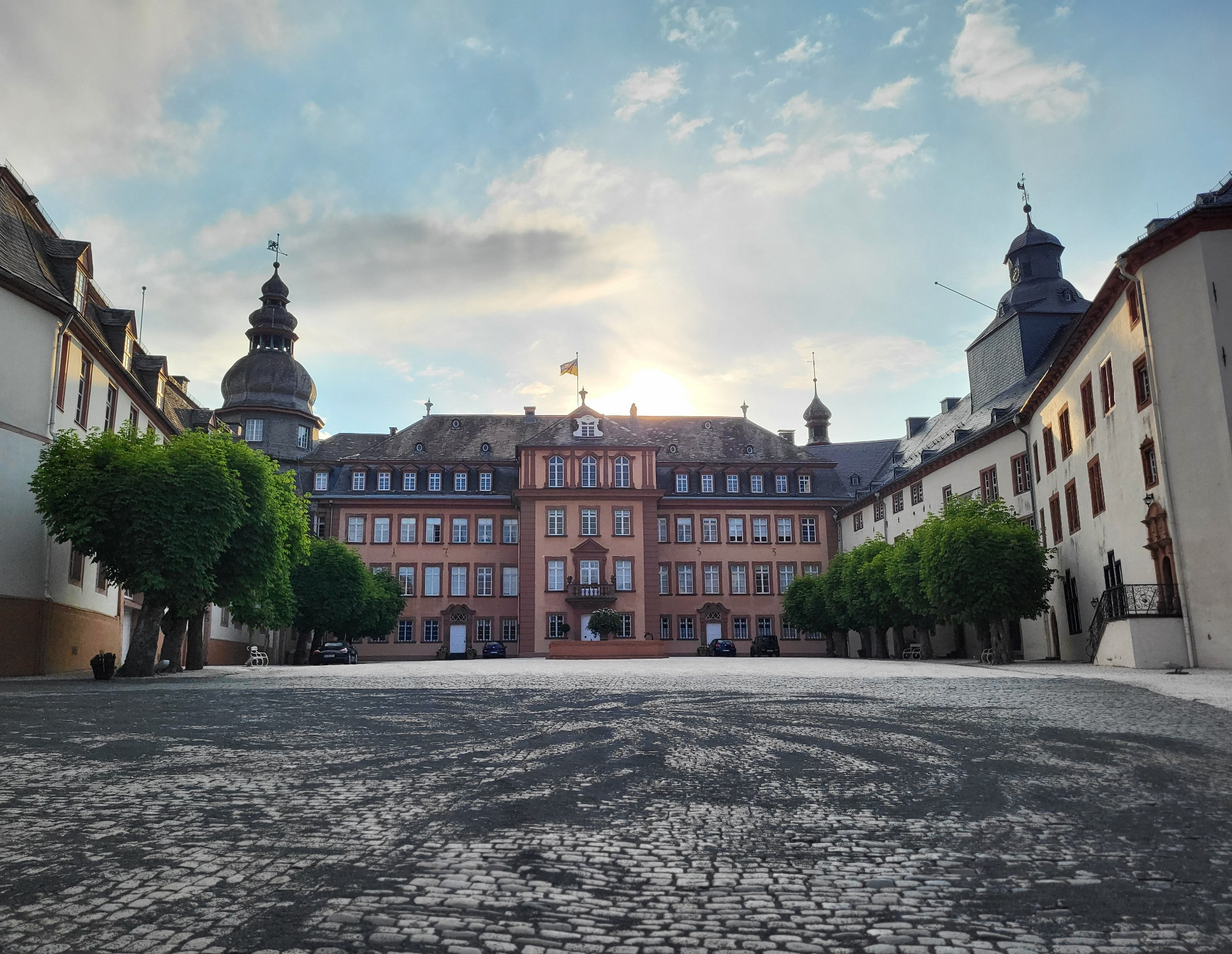
Berleburg Castle, photographed in 2022.

Prince Richard was born on 27 May 1882 at Berleburg, Germany, to Prince Gustav of Sayn-Wittgenstein-Berleburg (1837–1889) and Baroness Marie von Gemmingen-Hornberg (1855–1946). His father was the younger son of Albrecht, 2nd Prince of Sayn-Wittgenstein-Berleburg (1777–1851), and thus a younger brother of Prince Albrecht (1834–1904), who at the time was the 3rd Prince of the mediatized German principality of Sayn-Wittgenstein-Berleburg.

Richard had two older sisters, Charlotte (1879–1968) and Hildegard (1880–1973), and a younger brother, Wolfgang (1887–1966), who all married and had issue.

On 21 November 1902, at Langenzell, he married Princess Madeleine of Löwenstein-Wertheim-Freudenberg, daughter of Prince Alfred of Löwenstein-Wertheim-Freudenberg and Countess Pauline von Reichenbach-Lessonitz.

Richard became head of the House of Sayn-Wittgenstein-Berleburg on the death of his paternal uncle, Albrecht (born 15 March 1834), the 3rd Prince of Sayn-Wittgenstein-Berleburg, who died unmarried and childless on 9 November 1904.

His title was de-recognized by the Weimar and other German Republics after abolition of the German Empire in 1918 but lawfully retained henceforth as a surname.

Prince Richard died aged 42 on 25 April 1925 in Hanau as the result of a traffic accident by Bruchköbel in the vicinity of Hanau. He was succeeded as head of the House of Sayn-Wittgenstein-Berleburg by his eldest son, Prince Gustav Albrecht.

== Issue ==
- Gustav Albrecht, 5th Prince of Sayn-Wittgenstein-Berleburg (1907-1944, declared dead in 1969 after being missing in action in Russia in 1944)
- Prince Christian Heinrich of Sayn-Wittgenstein-Berleburg (1908-1983) – adopted by August, 4th Prince of Sayn-Wittgenstein-Hohenstein, who he succeeded as 5th Prince in 1947. Married firstly Countess Beatrix von Bismarck-Schönhausen (1921-2006) in 1945 at Berleburg. They had 4 children and were subsequently divorced in 1951. He married secondly Princess Dagmar of Sayn-Wittgenstein-Hohenstein (1919-2002), daughter of his adopted father's younger brother, Prince Georg, in 1960 at Schwarzenau. They had two children.
  - Princess Loretta of Sayn-Wittgenstein-Hohenstein (born 6 June 1946) who has married twice and had 3 children.
  - Princess Johanna of Sayn-Wittgenstein-Hohenstein (born 22 October 1948) who has married thrice and had 4 children.
  - Hereditary Prince Albrecht of Sayn-Wittgenstein-Hohenstein (1950-1953).
  - Princess Madeleine of Sayn-Wittgenstein-Hohenstein (born 17 March 1961) who has married twice and had 2 children.
  - Bernhart, 6th Prince of Sayn-Wittgenstein-Hohenstein (born 15 November 1962).
- Prince Ludwig Ferdinand of Sayn-Wittgenstein-Berleburg (1910-1943).

Richard, 4th Prince of Sayn-Wittgenstein-Berleburg House of Sayn-Wittgenstein-Berleburg Born: 1882 Died: 1925
Preceded by Albrecht	Prince of Sayn-Wittgenstein-Berleburg; 1904–1918	Monarchy abolished (German Revolution of 1918-19)
Titles in pretence
Titles extant before German Revolution of 1918–19	— TITULAR — Prince of Sayn-Wittgenstein-Berleburg; 1918 – 1925	Succeeded by Gustav Albrecht
