= Prince Richard of Hesse =

German prince and Nazi official (1901–1969)

Prince Richard
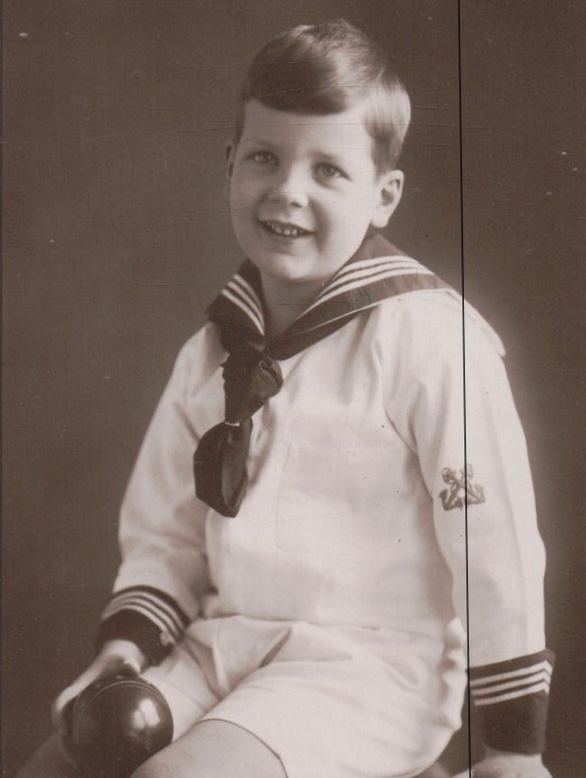
- Richard in 1907
- Born: 14 May 1901; Frankfurt, Hesse, German Empire
- Died: 11 February 1969 (aged 67); Frankfurt, Germany
Names
- Richard Wilhelm Leopold
- House: Hesse-Kassel
- Father: Prince Frederick Charles of Hesse
- Mother: Princess Margaret of Prussia

Prince Richard of Hesse (Richard Wilhelm Leopold; 14 May 1901 – 11 February 1969) was a German prince and politician. He was Obergruppenführer in the National Socialist Motor Corps (NSKK) and President of the German Road Safety Association.

== Early life ==
Prince Richard and his twin brother Christoph were born on 14 May 1901 in Frankfurt am Main, in Prussian Hesse as the fifth son Prince Frederick Charles of Hesse and his wife Princess Margaret of Prussia. His great-grandmother was Queen Victoria, his mother was the youngest sister of Emperor Wilhelm II.

Richard, affectionately nicknamed "Ri" by his family, grew up in a loving and close-knit family. He received a cosmopolitan education, given by governesses and tutors of different nationalities. In addition to German, he learned English, which the family used extensively in their private life.

== Career and later life ==
=== The First World War and the fall of the imperial regime ===
Too young to be mobilized when the First World War broke out, Richard and Prince Christoph of Hesse-Kassel spent most of the conflict in Kronberg, where they were educated at the Reform Realgymnasium. Unlike his twin brother, who did not take the exam, Richard obtained the abitur in 1920.

In 1918, the defeat of the German Empire against the Entente was accompanied by a wave of revolutions which overthrew the Germanic dynasties one by one. Closely linked to the former Kaiser Wilhelm II, whose sister was Princess Margaret, the Hesse-Kassel were then attacked by the revolutionaries. Their horses and cars were thus confiscated, and the family went through great moments of anguish. In this unstable context, Richard and Christoph engage as auxiliaries (hilfsdient) to protect the transports passing through Kronberg while awaiting the arrival of the French occupation troops.

=== Training and love life ===
After World War I, Richard studied civil engineering and mechanical engineering at the Darmstadt University of Technology. Then he worked for the German Locomotive Image Archive. Passionate about transport engineering and automotive engineering, he also joined the Allgemeiner Deutscher Automobil-Club.

From a sentimental point of view, Richard fell in love with Princess Sophie of Greece and Denmark, met around 1927. However, she fell in love with Richard's twin brother Prince Christoph of Hesse-Kassel, and it is the latter that she married, in 1930.

=== Adherence to Nazism ===
Like his three brothers, Richard was enthusiastic about Nazism. In 1932, the prince thus joined simultaneously the SA and the NSDAP. During the summer of 1933, he also actively participated in the organization of events linked to the Nazi party and in particular to the 5th Nuremberg rallies.

Subsequently, Richard became a general (Obergruppenführer) in the Nationalsozialistisches Kraftfahrkorps (NSKK), a special unit of the SA corps, and obtained leadership of the Motorgruppe Hessen in 1935. He also played an important role in the establishment of the National Socialist Motor Corps.

From a more political point of view, the prince ran, without success, in the German parliamentary elections of March 1936 and April 1938.

=== The Second World War and its consequences ===
Prince Richard enlisted in the German Army shortly after the outbreak of the Second World War. With his brother Wolfgang, he participated in the invasion and occupation of Norway from April 1940.

HAS following the strengthening of the "decree of the princes", Richard was however informed of his dismissal from the army by the Reichsleiter Martin Bormann in October 1943. He was also relieved of his duties in the Nationalsozialistisches Kraftfahrkorps.

At the same time, his older brother Philipp and his sister-in-law Mafalda of Italy were arrested by the Hitler regime while his twin brother, Prince Christoph of Hesse-Kassel, died in a plane crash.

=== Post-war and its consequences ===
The defeat of Germany and its occupation by the Allies brought new difficulties to Richard's life. Arrested by the Americans shortly after the capitulation of his country, the prince was interned for sixteen months in the camp of Moosburg, in Bavaria. He was finally released during the summer of 1946.

Several months later, the prince underwent a denazification trial. In August 1948, he was thus placed in category III ("minor offender") of those responsible for the Nazi regime. Having appealed this decision, he was finally classified in category IV (“fellow travelers”), in May 1949.

Meanwhile, the jewels of the House of Hesse-Kassel were stolen by American officers in 1946 and only 10% of the stolen objects were finally returned to their rightful owners, in 1951.

=== Later years ===
After the Second World War, Richard assisted his brother Prince Wolfgang of Hesse for a while in the management of the Hessische Hausstiftung.

Subsequently, he was appointed to the traffic surveillance of the state of Hesse. This function later led him to exercise the presidency of the Deutsche Verkehrswacht.

In the same years, Richard of Hesse-Kassel joined the spiritual movement of “Moral Rearmament”, founded by the Lutheran pastor Frank Buchman. There he rubbed shoulders with his cousin, King Michael I of Romania.

Prince Richard died in 1969.

== Ancestry ==
Ancestors of Prince Richard of Hesse

8. Prince William of Hesse-Kassel
4. Prince Frederick William of Hesse-Kassel
9. Princess Louise Charlotte of Denmark
2. Prince Frederick Charles of Hesse
10. Prince Charles of Prussia
5. Princess Anna of Prussia
11. Princess Marie of Saxe-Weimar-Eisenach
1. Prince Richard of Hesse
12. William I, German Emperor
6. Frederick III, German Emperor
13. Princess Augusta of Saxe-Weimar-Eisenach
3. Princess Margaret of Prussia
14. Prince Albert of Saxe-Coburg and Gotha
7. Victoria, Princess Royal
15. Victoria of the United Kingdom

== Sources ==
- Petropoulos, Jonathan (2006). Royals and the Reich: The Princes von Hessen in Nazi Germany. Oxford University Press. ISBN 0-19-920377-6.
