= Princess Marie Louise of Hanover =

Hanoverian princess (1879–1948)

Marie Louise
- Margravine of Baden
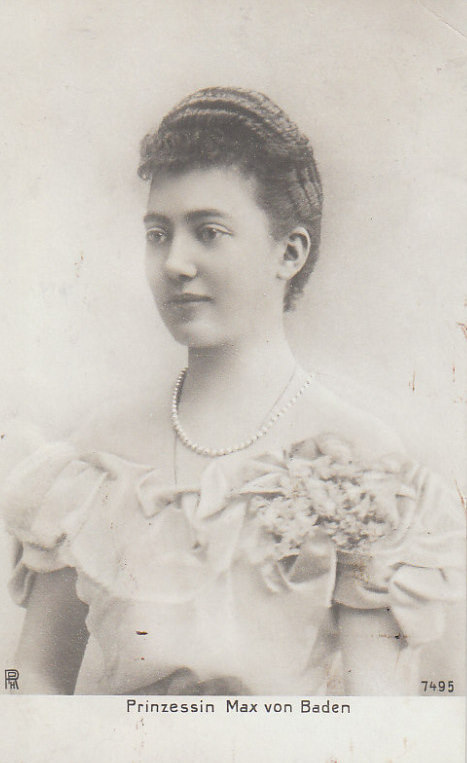
- Marie Louise in 1908
- Born: 11 October 1879; Gmunden, Upper Austria, Austria-Hungary
- Died: 31 January 1948 (aged 68); Salem, Baden, Germany
- Spouse: Prince Maximilian of Baden (m. 1900; died 1929)
- Issue: Marie Alexandra, Princess Wolfgang of Hesse; Berthold, Margrave of Baden
Names
- Marie Louise Victoria Caroline Amalie Alexandra Augusta Friederike
- House: Hanover
- Father: Ernest Augustus, Crown Prince of Hanover
- Mother: Princess Thyra of Denmark

Princess Marie Louise of Hanover and Cumberland (11 October 1879 – 31 January 1948) was the eldest child of Ernest Augustus, Crown Prince of Hanover, and Princess Thyra of Denmark, the youngest daughter of Christian IX of Denmark and Louise of Hesse-Kassel. Through her father, Marie Louise was a great-great-granddaughter of George III of the United Kingdom and Charlotte of Mecklenburg-Strelitz. She was a first cousin of Nicholas II of Russia, Constantine I of Greece, Christian X of Denmark, Haakon VII of Norway and Queen Maud of Norway and George V of the United Kingdom.

== Marriage and children ==
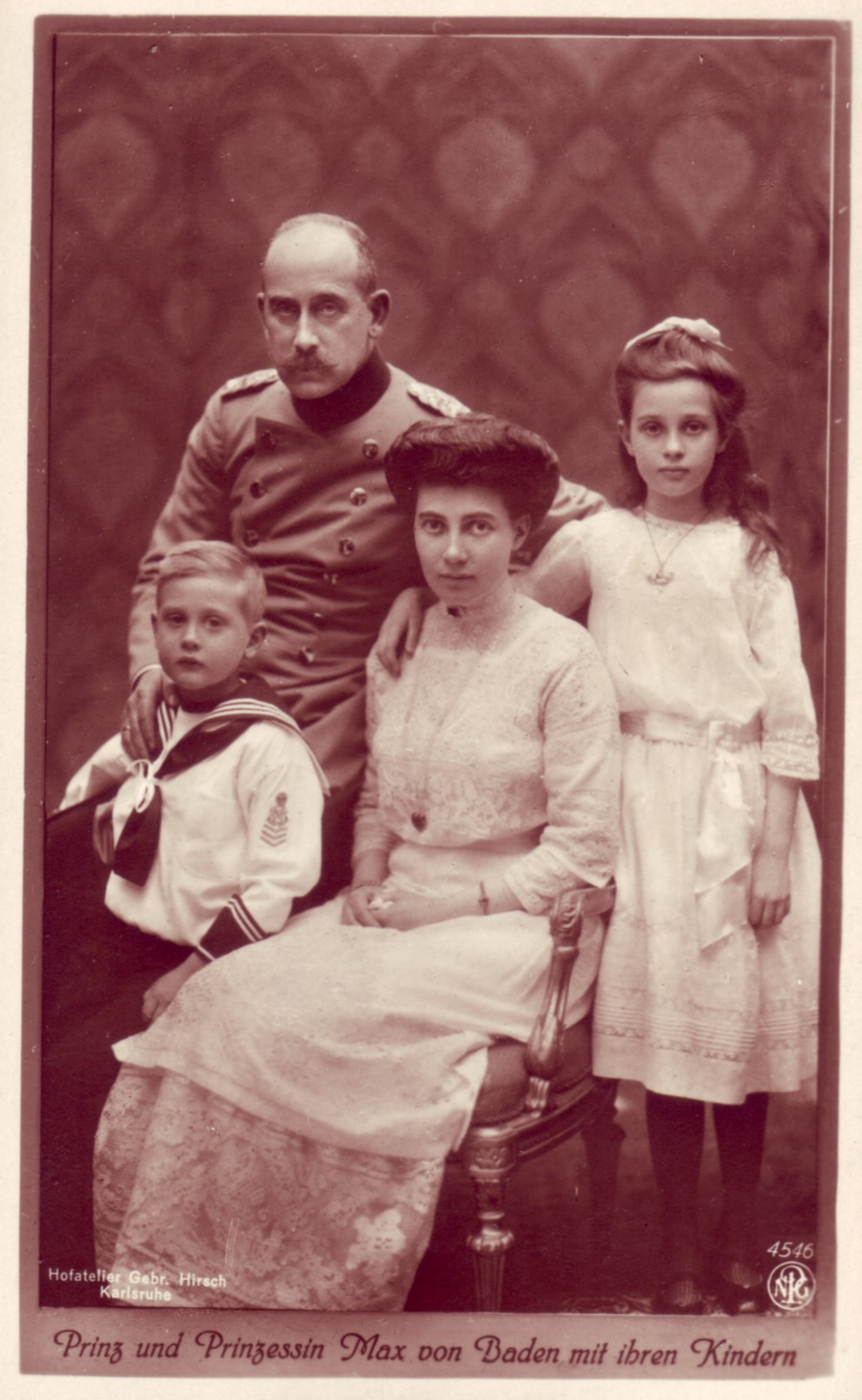
Princess Marie Louise with her family, 1914

Marie Louise married Prince Maximilian of Baden (1867–1929), her third cousin twice removed, on 10 July 1900 in Gmunden, Austria-Hungary. He was the son of Prince Wilhelm of Baden and Princess Maria Maximilianovna of Leuchtenberg and became a first cousin twice removed of Napoleon III of France. Marie Louise and Maximilian had one daughter and one son:

- Princess Marie Alexandra of Baden (1 August 1902 – 29 January 1944). Married Prince Wolfgang Moritz of Hesse-Kassel, a son of Prince Frederick Charles of Hesse-Kassel and Princess Margaret of Prussia. Marie Alexandra was killed in a bombing of Frankfurt by the Allies of World War II.
- Berthold, Margrave of Baden (24 February 1906 – 27 October 1963). Married Princess Theodora of Greece and Denmark, a daughter of Prince Andrew of Greece and Denmark and Princess Alice of Battenberg. Prince Berthold was the brother-in-law of Philip, Duke of Edinburgh.

== Ancestry ==
Ancestors of Princess Marie Louise of Hanover

8. Ernest Augustus, King of Hanover
4. George V of Hanover
9. Duchess Frederica of Mecklenburg-Strelitz
2. Ernest Augustus, Crown Prince of Hanover
10. Joseph, Duke of Saxe-Altenburg
5. Princess Marie of Saxe-Altenburg
11. Duchess Amelia of Württemberg
1. Princess Marie Louise of Hanover
12. Frederick William, Duke of Schleswig-Holstein-Sonderburg-Glücksburg
6. Christian IX of Denmark
13. Princess Louise Caroline of Hesse-Kassel
3. Princess Thyra of Denmark
14. Prince William of Hesse-Kassel
7. Princess Louise of Hesse-Kassel
15. Princess Charlotte of Denmark

Princess Marie Louise of Hanover House of Hanover Cadet branch of the House of Welf Born: 11 October 1879 Died: 31 January 1948
Titles in pretence
Preceded by Hilda of Nassau	— TITULAR — Grand Duchess consort of Baden; 8 August 1928 – 6 November 1929; Reason for succession failure: Grand Duchy abolished in 1918	Succeeded by Princess Theodora of Greece and Denmark
