= Moritz, Landgrave of Hesse =

German noble (1926–2013)

Moritz
- Landgrave of Hesse
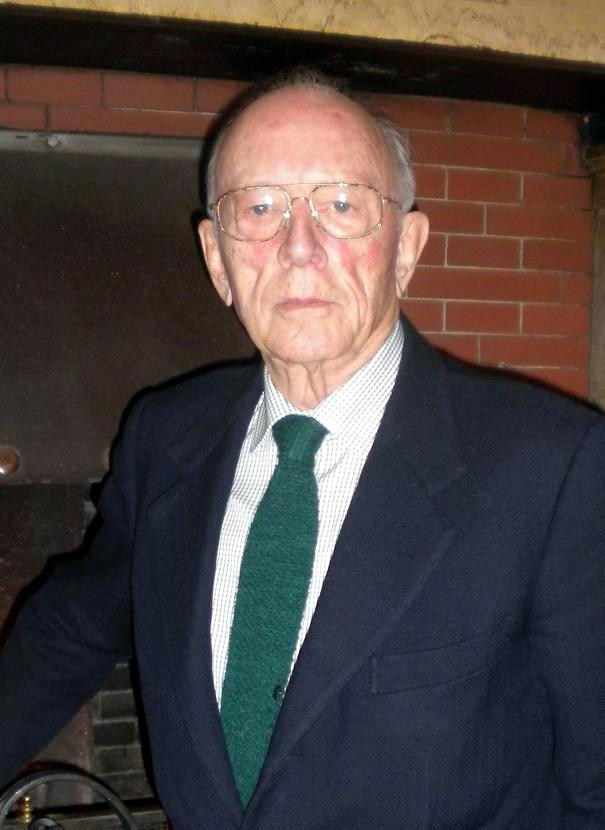
- Landgrave Moritz at Kronberg Castle in November 2010

Head of the House of Hesse
- Tenure: 25 October 1980 – 23 May 2013
- Predecessor: Philipp
- Successor: Donatus
- Born: 6 August 1926; Castle of Racconigi, Cuneo, Italy
- Died: 23 May 2013 (aged 86); Frankfurt-am-Main, Hesse, Germany
- Spouse: Princess Tatiana of Sayn-Wittgenstein-Berleburg (m. 1964; div. 1974)
- Issue: Princess Mafalda; Donatus, Landgrave of Hesse; Princess Elena; Prince Philipp
- House: Hesse
- Father: Philipp, Landgrave of Hesse
- Mother: Princess Mafalda of Savoy

Moritz, Landgrave of Hesse (legally Moritz Friedrich Karl Emanuel Humbert Prinz und Landgraf von Hessen; 6 August 1926 – 23 May 2013) was the son of Prince Philip, Landgrave of Hesse, and the head of the House of Hesse, also known as the House of Brabant.

== Life ==
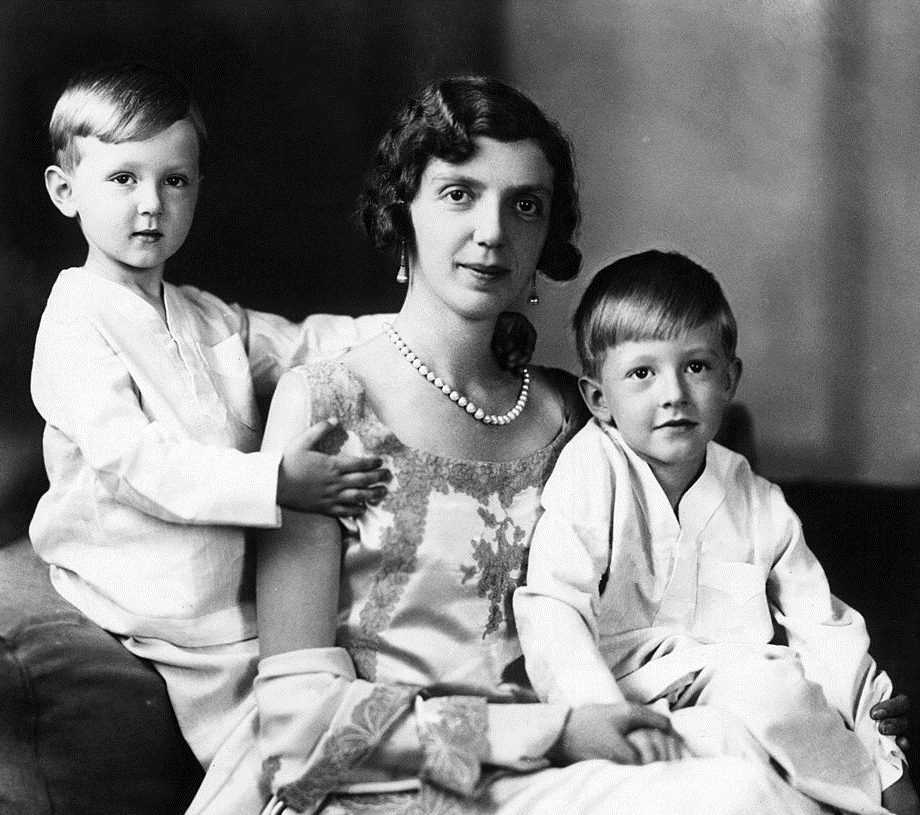
Princess Mafalda with her two sons, Moritz and Heinrich in the 1930s.

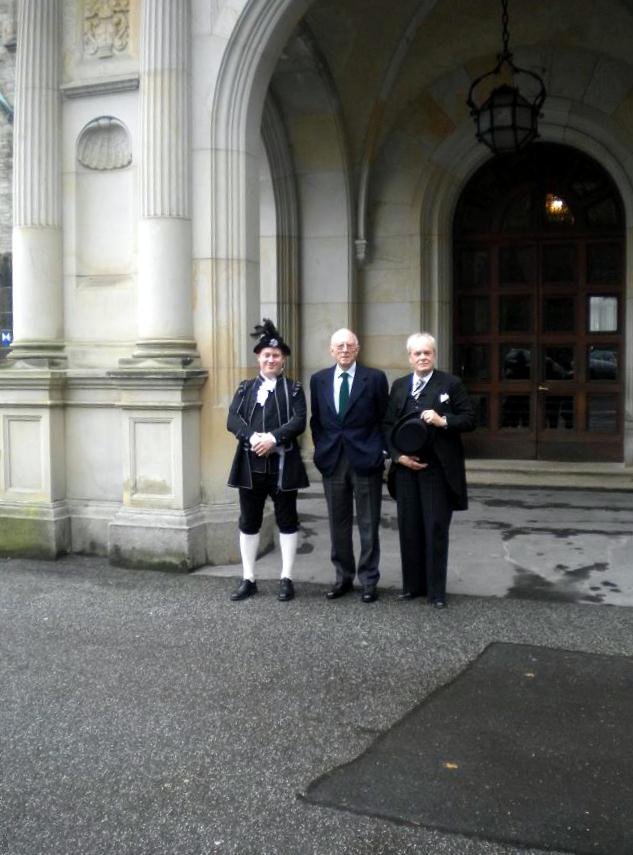
With Swedish visitors at Kronberg in 2010

Landgrave Moritz was born at Racconigi Castle, in Italy. During the Second World War, Moritz's mother, Princess Mafalda of Savoy, was arrested by the Nazis for alleged subversive activities and died in the Buchenwald concentration camp in 1944 after a U.S. bombing raid on the camp. Moritz and his siblings (Heinrich, Otto and Elisabeth) were given sanctuary in the Vatican under the care of their uncle Louis, Prince of Hesse and by Rhine and aunt Margaret Campbell Geddes who adopted them.

After the War they were reunited with their father in Germany. Together with his younger brothers, he took part in the ship tour organized by Queen Frederica and her husband King Paul of Greece in 1954, which became known as the “Cruise of the Kings” and was attended by over 100 royals from all over Europe.

Prince Louis of Hesse and by Rhine, the last head of the Hesse-Darmstadt line, died in 1968, at which time Moritz's father succeeded him as head of the entire house. Moritz became the head of the House of Hesse after the death of his father Philip on 25 October 1980.

Moritz was a world-famous art collector. He presided over the Foundation of the House of Hesse which is the proprietor of the Kronberg Palace Hotel and several manor estates and palaces. He lived at Schloß Wolfsgarten south of Frankfurt am Main and Panker estate in Schleswig-Holstein

He died aged 86 of a lung disease in a hospital in Frankfurt, Germany.

== Marriage and children ==
Moritz married Princess Tatiana of Sayn-Wittgenstein-Berleburg, daughter of Prince Gustav Albrecht. Their marriage took place in the summer of 1964 in Giessen and ended in divorce in 1974. They had four children.

- Mafalda Margarethe (born 6 July 1965). Married 1st Enrico dei Conti Marone Cinzano (born 5 April 1963, Turin) on 8 July 1989 (div. 1990) with no issue. Married 2nd Carlo Galdo (born 26 March 1954, Naples) on 19 December 1991 (div. 1999) and had two daughters. Married 3rd Ferdinando dei Conti Brachetti Peretti (born 13 January 1960, Rome) on 28 September 2000 (div. 2014) and had two sons.
- Heinrich Donatus Philipp Umberto (born 17 October 1966). Married Countess Floria Franziska von Faber-Castell (born 14 October 1974, Düsseldorf, Germany) on 25 April 2003 (civil ceremony) and on 17 May 2003 (religious ceremony) and has a daughter and two sons.
- Elena Elisabeth Madeleine (born 8 November 1967) has a daughter by Massimo Caiazzo (born 1976).
- Philipp Robin (born 17 September 1970). Married Laetitia Bechtolf (born 5 May 1978, Wedel, Pinneberg, Schleswig-Holstein, Germany) on 5 May 2006 (civil ceremony) and on 10 June 2006 (religious ceremony) and has three daughters and a son.

== Ancestry ==
Ancestors of Moritz, Landgrave of Hesse

8. Prince Frederick William of Hesse-Kassel
4. Prince Frederick Charles of Hesse
9. Princess Anna of Prussia
2. Philipp, Landgrave of Hesse
10. Frederick III, German Emperor
5. Princess Margaret of Prussia
11. Victoria, Princess Royal
1. Moritz, Landgrave of Hesse
12. Umberto I of Italy
6. Victor Emmanuel III of Italy
13. Princess Margherita of Savoy-Genoa
3. Princess Mafalda of Savoy
14. Nicholas I of Montenegro
7. Princess Elena of Montenegro
15. Milena Vukotić

Moritz, Landgrave of Hesse House of Hesse Born: 6 August 1926 Died: 23 May 2013
Regnal titles
| Preceded by Prince Philipp of Hesse | Head of the House of Hesse; 25 October 1980 – 23 May 2013 | Succeeded by Donatus, Landgrave of Hesse |
Titles in pretence
| Preceded by Philipp | — TITULAR — Grand Duke of Hesse and by Rhine; Elector of Hesse; 25 October 1980 – 23 May 2013; Reason for succession failure: Grand Duchy abolished in 1918; Electorate annexed by Prussia in 1866 | Succeeded by Donatus |
