= Prince Heinrich of Hesse-Kassel =

German royal (1927–1999)

Prince Heinrich
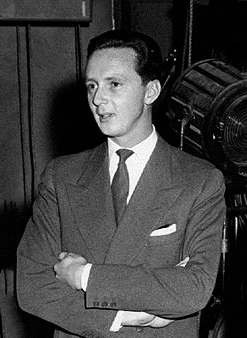
- Heinrich of Hesse-Kassel in the 1950s
- Born: 30 October 1927; Rome, Kingdom of Italy
- Died: 18 November 1999 (aged 72); Frankfurt, Germany
Names
- Henry William Constantine Victor Francis
- House: Hesse-Kassel
- Father: Prince Philipp of Hesse
- Mother: Princess Mafalda of Savoy

Prince Heinrich Wilhelm Konstantin Viktor Franz of Hesse-Kassel (30 October 1927 – 18 November 1999), also known as Enrico d'Assia, was the second child of Prince Philipp of Hesse and Princess Mafalda of Savoy. Heinrich became an artist, set designer, and memoirist after World War II.

== Life ==
Prince Heinrich was born in Rome, Italy, as the second son of Prince Philipp of Hesse and Princess Mafalda of Savoy, daughter of King Victor Emmanuel III of Italy.

During the Second World War, Heinrich's father, an important former aristocratic Nazi party member, was arrested by the Gestapo. His mother was detained and imprisoned in Buchenwald concentration camp, where she was killed by Allies' bombardments in 1944. Heinrich and his siblings (Moritz, Otto and Elisabeth) were given sanctuary in the Vatican under the care of their aunt and uncle, Margaret Campbell Geddes and Louis, Prince of Hesse and by Rhine, who adopted them. After the war, they were reunited with their father in Germany.

Heinrich was an artist and set designer, active mainly in Italy under the name Enrico d'Assia. He published a volume of memoirs, notably Der Kristallene Lüster (1994). He died in Frankfurt, unmarried.

== Ancestry ==
Ancestors of Prince Heinrich of Hesse-Kassel

8. Prince Frederick William of Hesse-Kassel
4. Prince Frederick Charles of Hesse-Kassel
9. Princess Anna of Prussia
2. Philipp, Landgrave of Hesse
10. Frederick III, German Emperor
5. Princess Margaret of Prussia
11. Victoria, Princess Royal
1. Prince Heinrich of Hesse-Kassel
12. Umberto I of Italy
6. Victor Emmanuel III of Italy
13. Princess Margherita of Savoy
3. Princess Mafalda of Savoy
14. Nicholas I of Montenegro
7. Princess Elena of Montenegro
15. Milena Vukotić

Prince Heinrich of Hesse-Kassel House of Hesse Born: 30 October 1927 Died: 18 November 1999
Titles in pretence
Preceded by Prince Wolfgang of Hesse	— TITULAR — King of Finland; 12 July 1989 – 18 November 1999; Reason for succession failure: Kingdom never established	Succeeded by Prince Philipp of Hesse
