= Philipp, Landgrave of Hesse =

German prince and Nazi official (1896–1980)

Prince Philipp
- Landgrave of Hesse
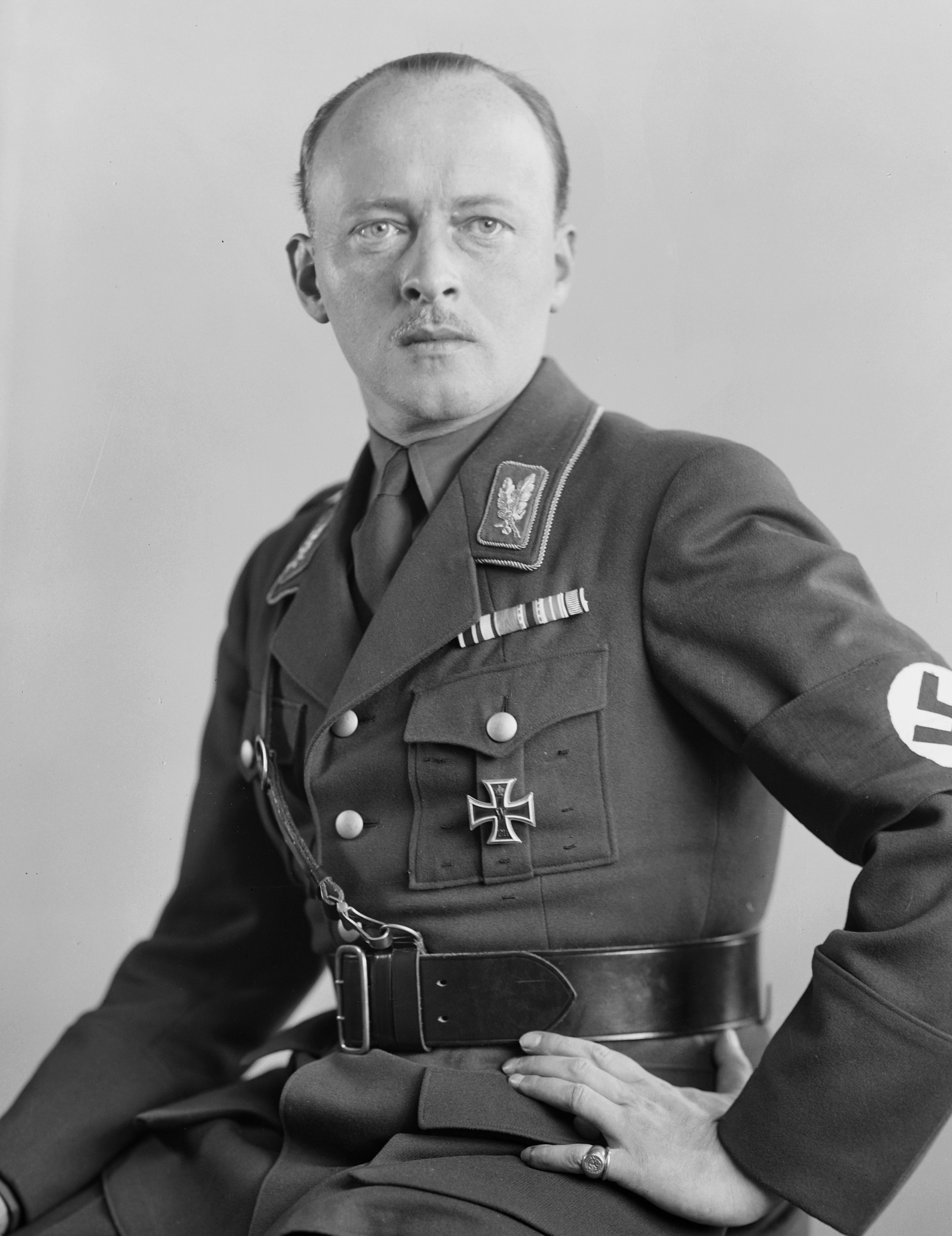
- Philipp c. 1933–1938

Head of the House of Hesse
- Tenure: 28 May 1940 – 25 October 1980
- Predecessor: Frederick Charles
- Successor: Moritz
- Born: 6 November 1896; Schloss Rumpenheim, Offenbach, Hesse, Germany
- Died: 25 October 1980 (aged 83); Rome, Italy
- Spouse: Princess Mafalda of Savoy (m. 1925; died 1944)
- Issue: Prince Moritz; Prince Heinrich; Prince Otto; Princess Elisabeth
- House: Hesse-Kassel
- Father: Prince Frederick Charles of Hesse
- Mother: Princess Margaret of Prussia

Philipp, Prince and Landgrave of Hesse (6 November 1896 – 25 October 1980) was head of the Electoral House of Hesse from 1940 to 1980.

Philipp joined the Nazi Party in 1930, and, when they gained power with the appointment of Adolf Hitler as Chancellor in 1933, he became Oberpräsident of the Prussian Province of Hesse-Nassau. However, he later began to fall out of favour with Hitler in the spring of 1943 after delivering an honest assessment of the military situation in Italy. He was arrested in September 1943 on the day Italy surrendered to the western Allies, dismissed in the following year, and was sent to the Flossenbürg concentration camp, then Dachau, where he remained until being transported to Tyrol by the SS, where he was liberated by Wehrmacht forces on 30 April 1945 and then arrested by U.S. forces on 4 May 1945, being interned until 1947.

Philipp was a grandson of Frederick III, German Emperor, and a great-grandson of Queen Victoria, as well as the son-in-law of Victor Emmanuel III of Italy.

== Early life ==
Philipp was born at Schloss Rumpenheim in Offenbach, the third son of Prince Frederick Charles of Hesse and of his wife Princess Margaret of Prussia (sister of the German Emperor Wilhelm II). Philipp had a younger twin brother Wolfgang, as well as two older brothers and two other younger twin brothers.

As a child, Philipp had an English governess. In 1910, he was sent to Britain to attend school in Bexhill-on-Sea. After returning to Germany, he attended a Musterschule in Frankfurt and then the Realgymnasium in Potsdam. He was the only one of the brothers who did not attend a military academy.

At the beginning of the First World War, Philipp joined the Hessian Dragoon-Regiment Nr. 24 along with his older brother Maximilian. They served first in Belgium where Maximilian was killed in October. In 1915 and 1916, Philipp served on the Eastern Front in what is now Ukraine. He held the rank of lieutenant (Leutnant, an extremely low rank considering his aristocratic background) and was mostly responsible for the procurement of munitions. In 1917, he served on the Hindenburg Line, before returning to Ukraine where he was wounded in combat.

In 1916, Philipp's oldest brother Friedrich Wilhelm died (in World War I) and Philipp became second in line to succeed his uncle as Head of the Electoral House of Hesse. In October 1918, Philipp's father was elected king of Finland. It was intended that Philipp would eventually succeed his father as Head of the House of Hesse, while his (younger) twin brother Wolfgang would be heir to the Finnish throne. The plans for a Finnish monarchy, however, soon came to an abrupt end with the defeat of Germany; Finland became a republic in July 1919.

Following the war, Philipp was a member of the Übergangsheer (the Transitional Army, precursor to the Reichswehr) which was successful in repressing communist and socialist action. From 1920 to 1922, he attended the Technical University in Darmstadt where he studied art history and architecture. He made several visits to Greece where his aunt, Princess Sophie of Prussia was the wife of King Constantine I.

In 1921 Philipp commenced a two year affair with Siegfried Sassoon, while also conducting an affair with a married woman. Sassoon found him charming, but "wholly unimaginative and coarsely sensual."

In 1922, Philipp left university without completing a degree and took a job at the Kaiser-Friedrich-Museum in Berlin. The following year, he moved to Rome where he used his aristocratic connections to establish himself as a successful interior designer. (He had designed some furniture for the palace his father intended to occupy as King of Finland.)

== Marriage and children ==
He married Princess Mafalda of Savoy, daughter of King Victor Emmanuel III of Italy, on 23 September 1925 at the Castello di Racconigi near Turin. The couple had four children:

- Prince Moritz, Landgrave of Hesse (6 August 1926 – 23 May 2013) he married Princess Tatiana of Sayn-Wittgenstein-Berleburg on 1 June 1964, with issue. They were divorced on 16 October 1974.
- Prince Heinrich Wilhelm Konstantin Viktor Franz of Hesse-Kassel (30 October 1927 – 18 November 1999).
- Prince Otto Adolf of Hesse-Kassel (3 June 1937 Rome – 3 January 1998 Hanover) he married Angela von Doering (daughter of Bernd von Doering and ex-wife of Hans-Peter Schmiedler) on 5 April 1965 and they were divorced on 3 February 1969. He married Elisabeth Bönker on 28 December 1988 and they were divorced in 1994.
- Princess Elisabeth Margarethe of Hesse-Kassel (8 October 1940 Rome, Italy) she married Count Friedrich Karl von Oppersdorff on 26 February 1962, with issue.

The family lived mostly at Villa Polissena (named after Queen Polyxena), part of Villa Savoia, the King of Italy's estate on the outskirts of Rome. But they also travelled frequently to Germany.

== Involvement with the NSDAP ==
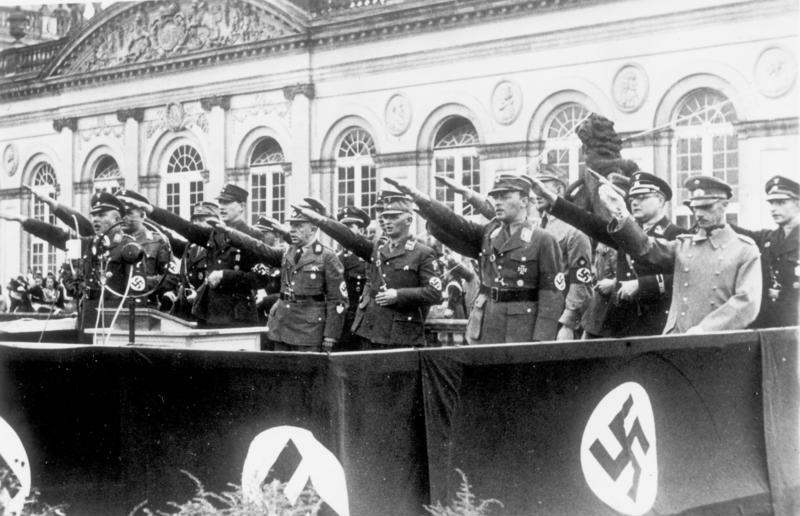
Philip of Hesse, second from right in the first row, in Kassel, 1933

While in Italy, Philipp fell under the influence of Fascism, or otherwise believed the Bolsheviks to be a greater threat. On his return to Germany in October 1930, he joined the National Socialist German Workers' Party. He was assigned Party membership number 418,991 and, on 30 January 1939, he would be awarded the Golden Party Badge. On 1 July 1932, he joined the Stormtroopers (SA, commonly referred to as the brownshirts) with the rank of SA-Oberführer. He was promoted to SA-Gruppenführer on 13 May 1933 and SA-Obergruppenführer on 9 November 1938. In 1933, his younger brother Christoph joined the Schutzstaffel (SS). Later, his two other brothers, including Wolfgang, also joined the SA. Through his party membership, Philipp became a particularly close friend of Hermann Göring, the future head of the German Air Force (Luftwaffe). Göring would bestow the rank of Luftwaffe Hauptmann of reserves on Philipp in 1936.

Following the appointment of Adolf Hitler as the German Chancellor on 30 January 1933, Philipp was appointed Oberpräsident (Governor) of Hesse-Nassau on 7 June 1933 by Prussian Minister-President Göring, who also named him to the Prussian State Council in July. Philipp played an important role in the consolidation of National Socialist rule in Germany. He introduced other aristocrats to NSDAP officials and, as son-in-law of the king of Italy, was a frequent go-between for Hitler and Benito Mussolini. He also acted as an art agent for Hitler in Italy. Philipp arranged the purchase of many important works of art for the large museum that Hitler was planning in Linz. For this purpose, the Reich Chancellery established a special account for him at the German Embassy in Rome, over which Prince Philipp could freely dispose. In 1940/41, German art purchases in Italy increased to such an extent that the Fascist government prohibited the sale of art treasures to foreigners in September 1941. On 11 March 1938, he delivered Hitler's letter of reassurance to Mussolini prior to Hitler's marching into Austria, and received a gushing call from Hitler upon the news of Mussolini's acquiescence.

As governor of Hesse-Nassau, Philipp was associated with the Aktion T4 euthanasia programme. In February 1941, Philipp signed the contract placing the sanitarium of Hadamar Clinic at the disposal of the Reich Interior Ministry. Over 10,000 mentally ill people were killed there. In 1946, Philipp was charged with murder, but the charges were later dropped.

As the war progressed, the attitude of the National Socialist authorities towards members of the German princely houses changed. While at first, they had been happy to use the historic family names to bolster popular support, they now decided to distance themselves even from those princes who had supported them.

In late April 1943, Philipp was ordered to report to Hitler's headquarters, where he stayed for most of the next four months. In May 1943, Hitler issued the "Decree Concerning Internationally Connected Men" declaring that princes could not hold positions in the party, state, or armed forces. The arrest of Mussolini by Philipp's father-in-law King Victor Emmanuel in July 1943 made Phillipp's position even more difficult.

=== Arrest ===
Hitler believed that Philipp and his family were complicit in Mussolini's downfall. On 8 September 1943, Philipp was arrested. He was stripped of his membership in the party and dismissed from the Luftwaffe. On 25 January 1944, his political disgrace became public when he was dismissed from his office as Oberpräsident of Hesse-Nassau.

In September 1943, Philipp was sent to Flossenbürg concentration camp. He was placed in solitary confinement and was not permitted any contact with the outside world. He was, however, granted certain privileges: wearing civilian clothes and eating the same food as the guards.

Philipp's wife Mafalda was arrested and placed under military custody in Rome. She was sent to Munich and Berlin for questioning and eventually to Buchenwald concentration camp where she was housed next to an armaments factory. In August 1944, the factory was bombed by the Allies. Mafalda was seriously injured and died several days later following a belated operation by camp medical staff.

==== Rescue ====
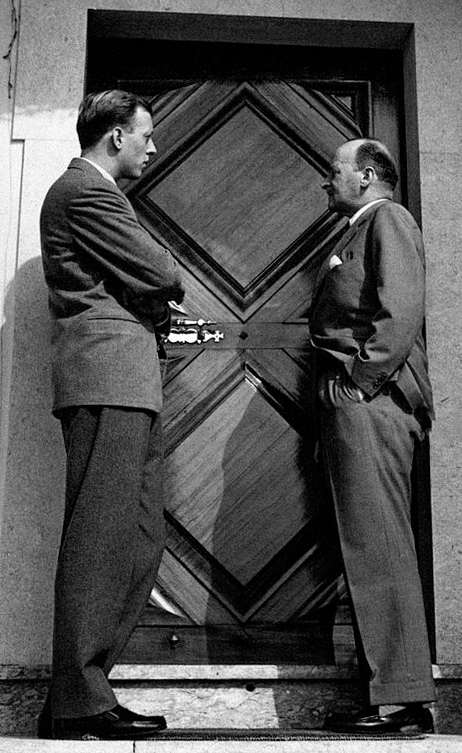
Moritz and Philipp of Hesse at the wedding of Princess Maria Pia of Savoy and Prince Alexander of Yugoslavia. Cascais, February 1955

As the Allies advanced into Germany in April 1945, Philipp was transferred to the Dachau concentration camp. After only ten days, he was transferred to Tyrol to Hotel "Bachmann" along with about 140 other prominent prisoners (for example Kurt Schuschnigg, Bogislaw von Bonin, Hjalmar Schacht, Martin Niemöller, Georg Thomas, and Alexander von Falkenhausen), freed by the Wehrmacht on 30 April 1945 (SS-Obergruppenführer Karl Wolff received a telephone call from the SS guards and ordered them to hand over the prisoners to the German army officers Hauptmann Wichard von Alvensleben and Hauptmann Gebhard von Alvensleben), and was then arrested by U.S. troops on 4 May 1945 in Niederdorf in the Italian Dolomites due to his role in the Nazi Party.

== After the war ==
Philipp was held by the Allies in Naples and subsequently was transferred to Camp Ashcan in Luxembourg and then to a series of other detention centres until 1947. He underwent denazification procedures in Darmstadt and, on 17 December 1947, was classified as Category II (offender). He was sentenced to 2 years in a labour camp, which was suspended on the basis of time served. He also was required to forfeit 30% of his property and assets, which were valued at 600,000 Deutsche Mark (DM). Subsequent appeals concluded in February 1949, and resulted in a reclassification as Category IV (follower) and a reduction of his fine to 36,568 DM.

On 28 May 1940, Philipp succeeded his father as Head of the Electoral House of Hesse. In 1968, upon the death of his distant agnatic relative, Louis, Prince of Hesse and by Rhine (who was also his second cousin as Philipp's mother and Louis' father were grandchildren of Queen Victoria), Philipp succeeded as head of the entire House of Hesse, including grand ducal Hesse (Hesse and by Rhine/Hesse-Darmstadt). Louis had nominally adopted Philipp's son Moritz, who at that time inherited the Hessian and by-Rhine properties, including remarkable cultural collections: for the first time since the division of Hesse into branches after the death of Philip the Magnanimous in 1567, all sovereign branches of the house of Hesse were reunited again.

Philipp died in Rome, Italy, in 1980.

== Awards and decorations ==
- 1914 Iron Cross 2nd Class
- 1914 Iron Cross 1st Class
- War Merit Cross (Brunswick)
- General Honor Decoration (Hesse)
- Order of Saint Alexander (Bulgaria)
- 1931 Brunswick Rally Badge c.1931
- The Honour Cross of the World War 1914/1918 with Swords, c.1934
- Anschluss Medal, c.1938
- Golden Party Badge on 30 January 1939
- Sudetenland Medal, c.1939
- Honour Chevron for the Old Guard
- Supreme Order of the Most Holy Annunciation
- War Merit Cross 2nd Class without Swords
- War Merit Cross 1st Class without Swords
- Nazi Party Long Service Award in Bronze
- Nazi Party Long Service Award in Silver

== Ancestry ==
Ancestors of Philipp, Landgrave of Hesse

8. Prince William of Hesse-Kassel
4. Prince Frederick William of Hesse-Kassel
9. Princess Charlotte of Denmark
2. Prince Frederick Charles of Hesse
10. Prince Charles of Prussia
5. Princess Anna of Prussia
11. Princess Marie of Saxe-Weimar-Eisenach
1. Philipp, Landgrave of Hesse
12. William I, German Emperor
6. Frederick III, German Emperor
13. Princess Augusta of Saxe-Weimar-Eisenach
3. Princess Margaret of Prussia
14. Prince Albert of Saxe-Coburg and Gotha
7. Victoria, Princess Royal
15. Victoria of the United Kingdom

Philipp, Landgrave of Hesse House of Hesse Born: 6 November 1896 Died: 25 October 1980
Regnal titles
Preceded by Prince Frederick Charles of Hesse	Head of the House of Hesse; 28 May 1940 – 25 October 1980	Succeeded by Moritz, Landgrave of Hesse
Titles in pretence
Preceded by Louis	— TITULAR — Grand Duke of Hesse and by Rhine; 30 May 1968 – 25 October 1980; Reason for succession failure: Grand Duchy abolished in 1918	Succeeded by Moritz, Landgrave of Hesse
