= Princess Margaret of Prussia =

Margaret of Prussia
- Landgravine of Hesse
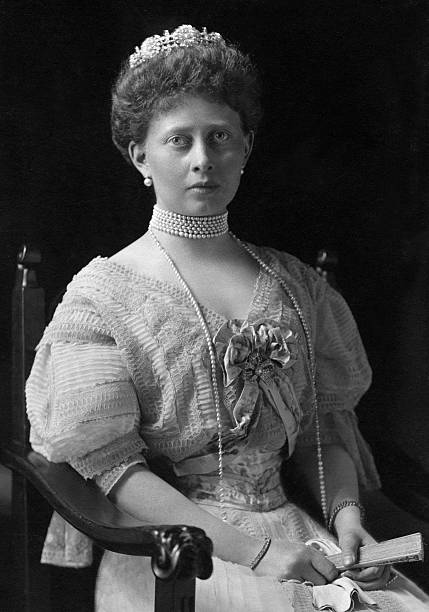
- c. 1905 photograph

Queen consort-elect of Finland
- Tenure: 9 October – 14 December 1918
- Born: 22 April 1872; New Palace, Potsdam, Prussia, German Empire
- Died: 22 January 1954 (aged 81); Schloss Friedrichshof, Kronberg im Taunus, Hesse, West Germany
- Burial: Schloss Friedrichshof, Kronberg im Taunus, Hesse, Germany
- Spouse: Frederick Charles, Landgrave of Hesse (m. 1893; died 1940)
- Issue Detail: Prince Friedrich Wilhelm; Prince Maximilian; Philipp, Landgrave of Hesse; Prince Wolfgang; Prince Christoph; Prince Richard
Names
- German: Margarethe Beatrice Feodora; English: Margaret Beatrice Feodora
- House: Hohenzollern
- Father: Frederick III, German Emperor
- Mother: Victoria, Princess Royal

Margaret of Prussia (German: Margarethe Beatrice Feodora; 22 April 1872 – 22 January 1954) was the youngest child of Frederick III, German Emperor, and Victoria, Princess Royal. She was also the younger sister of Emperor Wilhelm II and the granddaughter of Queen Victoria. She married Prince Frederick Charles of Hesse, the elected King of Finland, making her the would-be Queen of Finland had he not decided to renounce the throne on 14 December 1918. In 1926, they assumed the titles of Landgrave and Landgravine of Hesse. The couple had six sons and lost three of them in wartime, two during the First and one during the Second World War.

== Early life ==
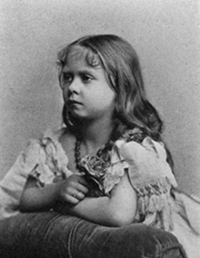
Princess Margaret in childhood

Princess Margaret of Prussia was the youngest of eight children born to Frederick III, then Crown Prince of the German Empire, and Victoria, Princess Royal, Britain's Queen Victoria's eldest daughter. Born on 22 April 1872 in the Hohenzollerns' New Palace in Potsdam, by the time the infant was christened, her head was covered with short hair like moss, from which she acquired her nickname "Mossy". She was named Margarethe Beatrice Feodora. Crown Princess Margherita of Italy was her godmother and Emperor Pedro II of Brazil was her godfather.

Princess Margaret grew up amid great privilege and formality. Together with her sisters, Princess Viktoria and Princess Sophie, Margaret was deeply attached to her parents, forming an antagonist group to that of her eldest siblings, William II, Princess Charlotte and Prince Henry. She remained close to her mother after the death of her father. Margaret was widely regarded as the most popular of Kaiser Wilhelm II's sisters, and she maintained good relations with a wide array of family members. She was the first cousin of both King George V of the United Kingdom and Empress Alexandra Feodorovna of Russia, all three being grandchildren of Victoria. As an adult, she was said to resemble her aunt, Princess Alice.

== Marriage ==
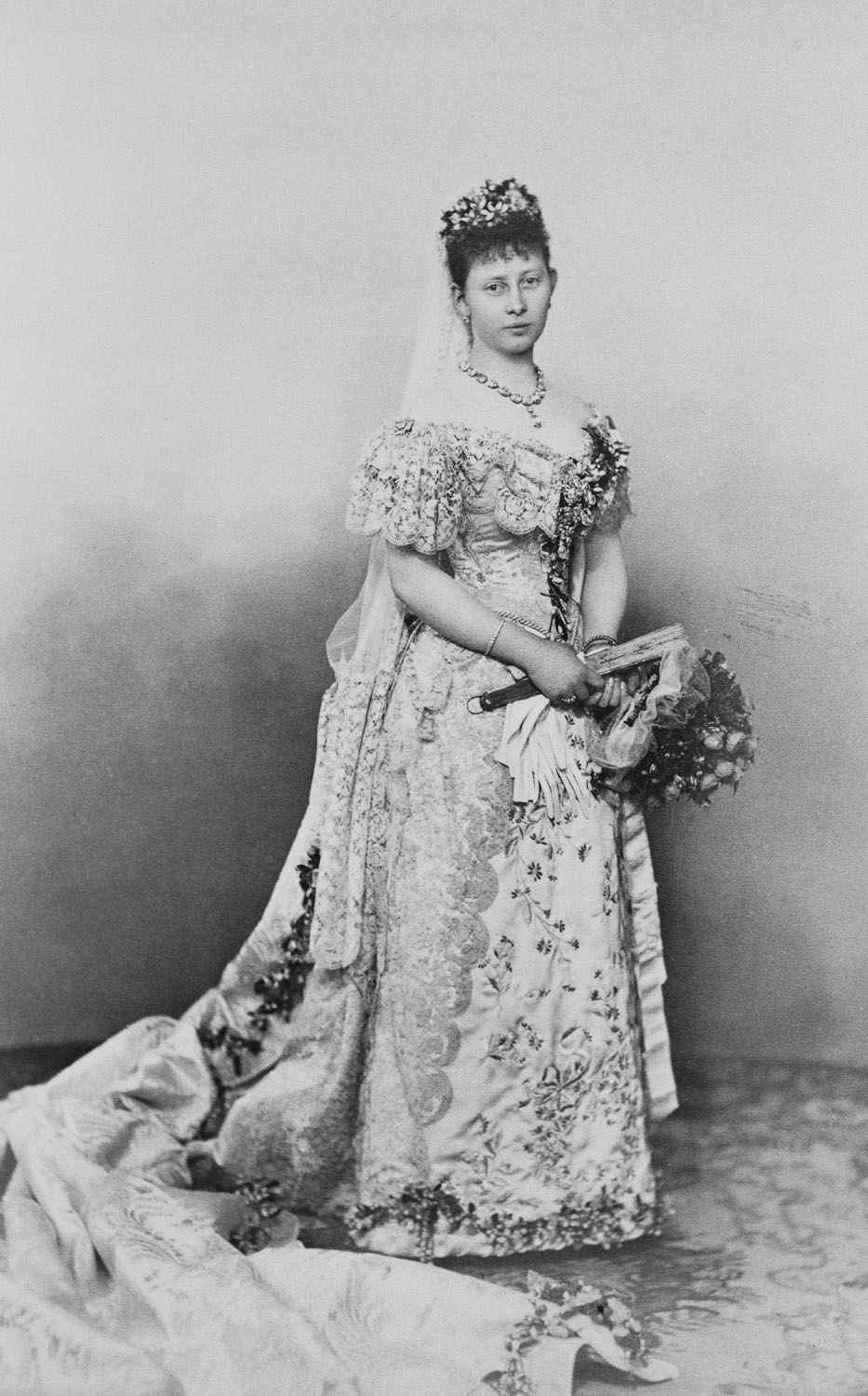
Princess Margaret in her wedding dress

Princess Margaret was first attracted to Prince Maximilian of Baden. When he did not reciprocate her affection, she moved on to her second choice, Max's close friend, Prince Frederick Charles of Hesse, future head of the Hesse-Kassel dynasty and future elected King of Finland. They were married on 25 January 1893 at the Hohenzollern Stadtschloss in Berlin on the anniversary of her parents' wedding.

At the time of the wedding, Prince Frederick Charles was not the Head of the House of Hesse-Kassel. The position was held by his older and virtually blind brother Landgrave Alexander Friederich, who relinquished it in the mid-1920s in order to enter an unequal marriage. Prince Frederick Charles, as was his title when he married, was addressed as His Highness, while Princess Margaret warranted Royal Highness. This disparity came to an end in 1925 when Frederick Charles became Landgrave of Hesse and Head of the house of Hesse-Kassel.

They were second cousins, both great-grandchildren of King Friedrich Wilhelm III of Prussia, he through his mother Anna, she through her father Friedrich. Initially, her brother Wilhelm opposed the match as he felt that Frederick Charles's position was too "minor" for the Kaiser's sister. Later, however, he gave his blessing, since Margaret herself "was so unimportant". The marriage was very happy. Princess Margaret had a strong personality; she always seemed more secure and grounded than her husband. The couple's main residence during the early years of marriage was Schloss Rumpenheim. Margaret's husband was her mother's favorite son-in-law. In 1901, Princess Margaret inherited Schloss Friedrichshof at the death of her mother. It was highly unconventional for a husband to reside in his wife's home. However, Margaret was committed to maintain the house of her mother which entailed a great expense and the family moved to Friedrichshof.

In 1918, Margaret's husband accepted the offer of the throne of newly independent Finland, but due to German misfortunes in World War I, soon renounced it. She would have become the Queen of Finland. Her predecessor as Grand Duchess-consort of Finland was her first cousin, Empress Alexandra Feodorovna of Russia.

== Family tragedies ==
Margaret's elder sons, Friedrich Wilhelm and Maximilian, were killed in action during World War I. Prince Maximilian, Princess Margaret's second and favorite son, was serving near Aisne when he was seriously wounded by machine gun fire in October 1914. He died soon afterward and his body was secretly buried in the village of Caestre by the local people, who learned he was the Kaiser's nephew. The priest refused to identify the grave until the Germans had left Belgium and a compensation was paid. Max's younger brother Wolfgang appealed for help to the British authorities, and eventually, after an enquiry was made, Maximilian's body was returned to his family. Princess Margaret's oldest son, Friedrich Wilhelm, died on 12 September 1916 at Kara Orman in Romania. He was killed in close fighting; his throat was slit by an enemy bayonet.

Her two other sons, Philipp and Christoph, embraced Nazism, and Margaret, who was the sister of the last Kaiser Wilhelm II, invited Adolf Hitler to tea and flew the swastika from her home at Schloss Kronberg. Philipp married Princess Mafalda, daughter of King Victor Emmanuel III of Italy. Due to his close relations with the King of Italy, Philipp was appointed in 1939 to Hitler's personal staff, since he could be a useful channel of communications between Nazi Germany and Fascist Italy. Publicly, he continued with his duties and occasionally he made private missions in Italy for Hitler. When Italy capitulated, he personally informed Hitler. Hitler's revenge recoiled on Philipp, who was imprisoned in a concentration camp for political prisoners. His wife Mafalda was taken to Buchenwald, where she died of a haemorrhage caused by the amputation of her arm, which had been mangled in a bombing raid on the camp.

Margaret's fifth son, Christoph, was a staunch supporter of the German war effort, but after the Battle of Stalingrad, he became frustrated by the limitations placed on his own role in the conflict, and increasingly critical of the German leadership. Christoph's reaction to the assassination of Heydrich, whom he called a "dangerous and cruel man", in 1942 was that it was "the best news I had in a long time". The Nazi regime had turned against his family by the time he died in a plane crash near Forli on 7 October 1943. He was married to Princess Sophie of Greece, sister of Philip, Prince of Greece and Denmark who, in 1947, married the heir to the throne of the United Kingdom and, in 1952, became Prince Philip, Duke of Edinburgh, consort of Queen Elizabeth II.

Margaret also lost another one of her daughters-in-law during the war. Wolfgang's wife, Princess Marie Alexandra, when she and seven other women war aid workers, were killed in a bomb attack on Frankfurt on 29–30 January 1944. The cellar in which they had taken refuge collapsed under the weight of the building, rendering Marie Alexandra's body barely recognisable.

Margaret, very much the matriarch, was at the centre of her large and dynamic family. During and after World War II, she took care of her grandchildren and tried to preserve a centre at Friedrichshof as their parents faced various tribulations.

== Last years ==
Landgravine Margaret had difficult years after 1945; they were compounded by the theft from Schloss Friedrichshof in November 1945 of the family jewellery, valued at over £2,000,000. After World War II, Friedrichshof was used as an officer's club by the military authorities during the American occupation. Princess Margaret's son Wolfgang, fearing for the jewels, had buried them in a sub-cellar of the castle. On 5 November 1945, the manager of the club, Captain Kathleen Nash, discovered the jewels and together with her future husband, Colonel Jack Durant, and Major David Watson, stole the treasure and took it out of Germany. In early 1946, Princess Margaret discovered the theft when the family wanted to use the jewels for the wedding of Princess Sophia who was preparing to remarry . Princess Sophia and Landgravine Margaret reported it to the Frankfurt authorities, and the culprits were imprisoned in August 1951. The Hesse family received what had been recovered: only 10 percent of what had been stolen.

Landgravine Margaret, the last surviving child of Emperor Frederick III and last grandchild of emperor Emperor Wilhelm I, died in Kronberg on 22 January 1954, 14 years after her husband and exactly 53 years to the day after her British grandmother Queen Victoria. She was 81 years old.

== Children ==
Landgravine Margaret and her husband Frederick Charles of Hesse had six sons, including two sets of twins:

- Prince Friedrich Wilhelm of Hesse-Kassel (24 November 1893 – 12 September 1916), killed in action in World War I.
- Prince Maximilian of Hesse-Kassel (20 October 1894 – 13 October 1914), killed in action in World War I.
- Prince Philipp of Hesse-Kassel (6 November 1896 – 25 October 1980 Rome), married on 23 September 1925 to Princess Mafalda of Savoy (19 November 1902 Rome – 28 August 1944), had issue.
- Prince Wolfgang of Hesse-Kassel (6 November 1896 – 12 July 1989), married Princess Marie Alexandra of Baden, no issue.
- Prince Richard Wilhelm Leopold of Hesse-Kassel (14 May 1901 – 11 February 1969).
- Prince Christoph of Hesse-Kassel (14 May 1901 – 7 October 1943), married Princess Sophie of Greece and Denmark (26 June 1914 Mon Repos, Corfu – 24 November 2001 Bavaria) on 13 December 1930 (civil) and 15 December 1930 (religious), had issue. Killed in action in World War II.

== Archives ==
Margaret's personal papers (including family correspondence) are preserved in the Archive of the House of Hesse, which is kept in Fasanerie Palace in Eichenzell, Germany.

== Honours ==
- Kingdom of Prussia:
  - Dame of the Order of Louise, 1st Division
  - Red Cross Medal, 1st Class
- Grand Duchy of Hesse: Dame of the Order of the Golden Lion, 25 January 1893
- United Kingdom: Royal Order of Victoria and Albert, 2nd Class

== Ancestry ==
Ancestors of Princess Margaret of Prussia

8. Frederick William III of Prussia
4. William I, German Emperor
9. Duchess Louise of Mecklenburg-Strelitz
2. Frederick III, German Emperor
10. Charles Frederick, Grand Duke of Saxe-Weimar-Eisenach
5. Princess Augusta of Saxe-Weimar-Eisenach
11. Grand Duchess Maria Pavlovna of Russia
1. Princess Margaret of Prussia
12. Ernest I, Duke of Saxe-Coburg and Gotha
6. Prince Albert of Saxe-Coburg and Gotha
13. Princess Louise of Saxe-Gotha-Altenburg
3. Victoria, Princess Royal
14. Prince Edward, Duke of Kent and Strathearn
7. Victoria of the United Kingdom
15. Princess Victoria of Saxe-Coburg-Saalfeld

== Bibliography ==
- Henri van Oene, Genealogy of the Royal Family of Prussia, 13 May 1998, 18 September 2011 <Genealogy of the Royal Family of Prussia>.
- Pakula, Hannah, An Uncommon Woman, Simon & Schuster, New York, 1995, ISBN 0-684-84216-5
- Petropoulos, Jonathan, Royals and the Reich, Oxford University Press, New York, 2006, ISBN 0-19-516133-5
- Van der Kiste, John, The Prussian Princesses: Sisters of Kaiser Wilhelm II, Fonthill, 2014
