= Prince Wolfgang of Hesse =

Prince Wolfgang
- Crown Prince of Finland
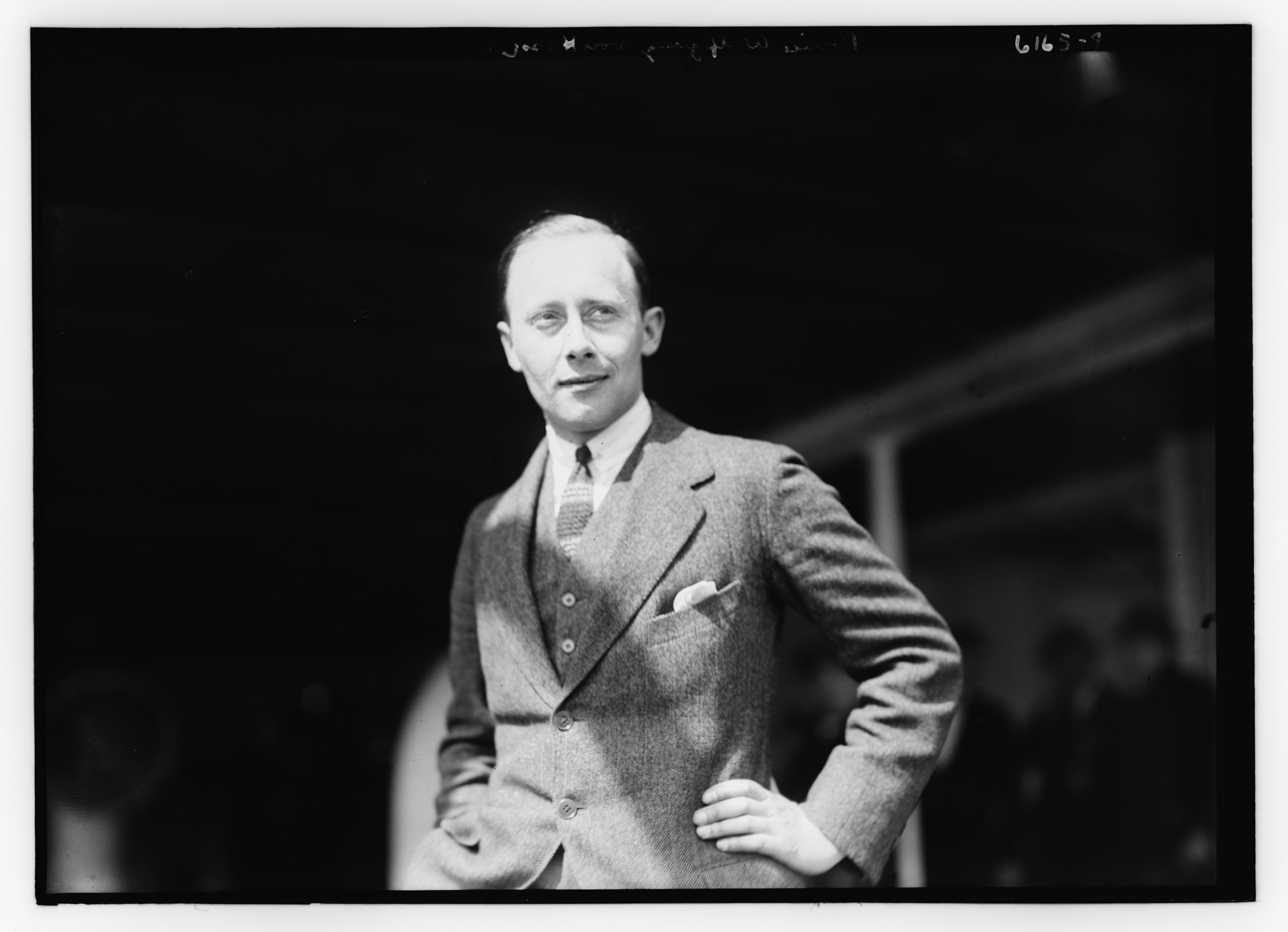
- Born: 6 November 1896; Castle Rumpenheim, Offenbach am Main, German Empire
- Died: 12 July 1989 (aged 92); Frankfurt, West Germany
- Spouse: Princess Marie Alexandra of Baden (m. 1924; died 1944) Ottilie Moeller (m. 1948)
Names
- Wolfgang Moritz
- House: Hesse-Kassel
- Father: Prince Frederick Charles of Hesse
- Mother: Princess Margaret of Prussia

Prince Wolfgang of Hesse (Wolfgang Moritz Prinz von Hessen; 6 November 1896 – 12 July 1989) was the district administrator of Obertaunuskreis from 1933 to 1945.

Wolfgang was born at Castle Rumpenheim, Offenbach am Main, the fourth son of Prince Frederick Charles of Hesse (1868–1940) and Princess Margaret of Prussia (1872–1954). His maternal uncle was the German Emperor Willhelm II.

In World War I, Wolfgang served as an officer in the command of Field Marshal August von Mackensen. Towards the end of the war, Wolfgang's father Frederick Charles of Hesse was selected by the Central Powers as a prospective King of Finland on 9 October 1918, to replace his first cousin once removed, the deposed Russian emperor, Nicholas II, who was titled Grand Duke of Finland. Wolfgang was designated heir, in preference to his elder twin brother Philipp to ensure the separation of the thrones of Hesse and Finland. However, Frederick Charles renounced his candidature on 14 December 1918, and the title was never actually held by the family. The German monarchies were abolished in the German revolution of 1918–1919.

Wolfgang married on 17 September 1924 Princess Marie Alexandra of Baden (1902–1944), daughter of Prince Maximilian of Baden and Princess Marie Louise of Hanover; they had no children.

He joined the NSDAP and the SA in December 1933, and was appointed Landrat (district administrator) of Obertaunuskreis, a landkreis in the state of Hesse, serving in that capacity until the end of World War II. His wife was killed in an air raid in 1944.

He married secondly Ottilie Moeller (1903–1991), the daughter of Ludwig Moeller and Eleanore Steinmann, in September 1948.

Prince Wolfgang of Hesse House of Hesse Born: 6 November 1896 Died: 12 July 1989
Titles in pretence
Preceded by Prince Frederick Charles of Hesse	— TITULAR — King of Finland; 28 May 1940 – 12 July 1989; Reason for succession failure: Kingdom never established	Succeeded by Prince Heinrich of Hesse
