= Princess Marie Alexandra of Baden =

- Princess Wolfgang of Hesse
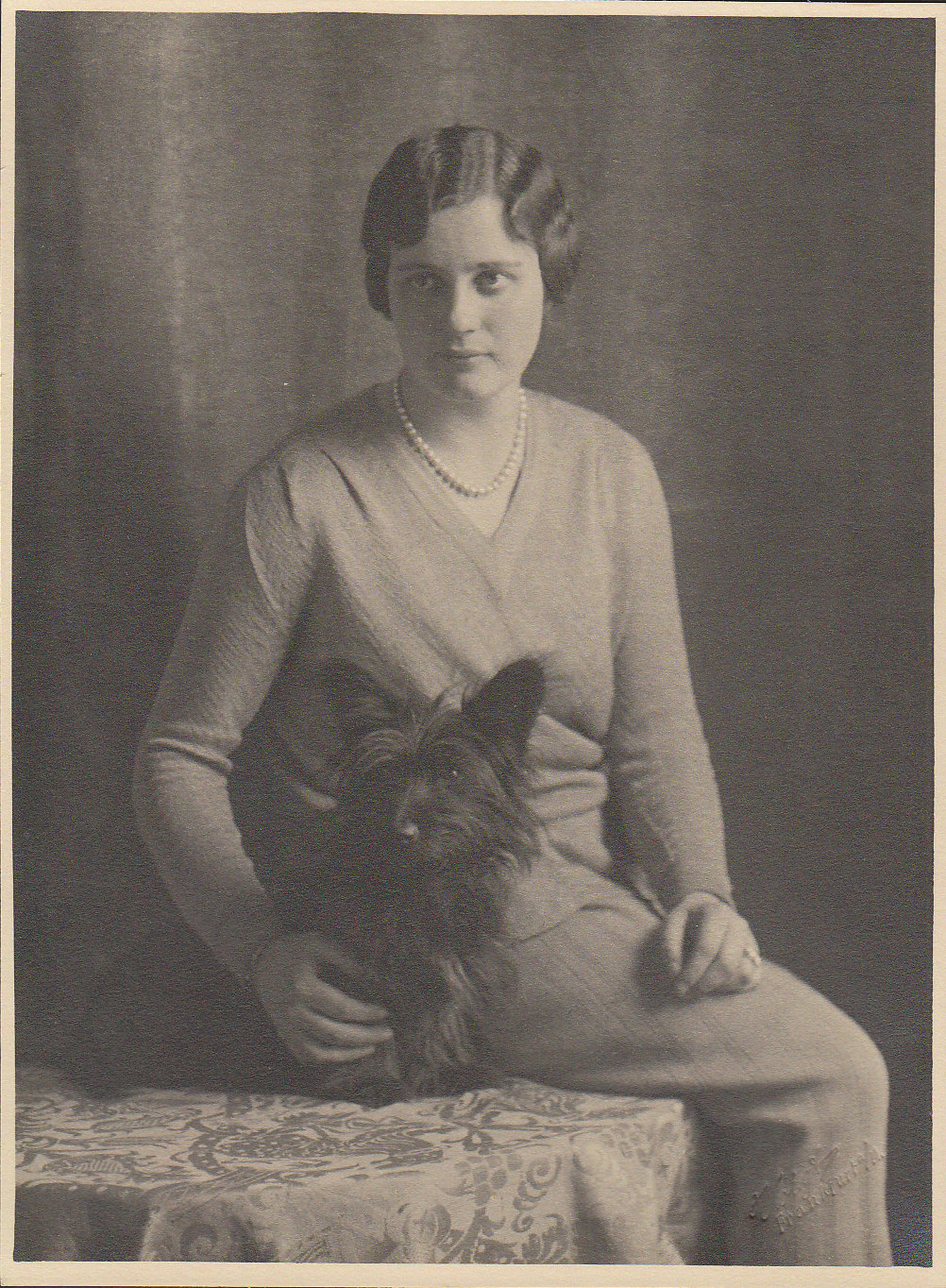
- Marie Alexandra in the 1920s
- Born: 1 August 1902; Salem, Baden-Württemberg, German Empire
- Died: 29 January 1944 (aged 41); Frankfurt am Main, Hesse, Nazi Germany
- Spouse: Prince Wolfgang of Hesse (m. 1924)
Names
- Marie Alexandra Thyra Victoria Louise Carola Hilda
- House: Baden
- Father: Prince Maximilian of Baden
- Mother: Princess Marie Louise of Hanover and Cumberland

Princess Marie Alexandra of Baden (Marie Alexandra Thyra Victoria Louise Carola Hilda; 1 August 1902 – 29 January 1944) was a Hessian princess by marriage.

== Family ==
She was the only daughter and elder child of Prince Maximilian of Baden and Princess Marie Louise of Hanover and Cumberland. Her paternal grandparents were Prince Wilhelm of Baden and Princess Maria Maximilianovna of Leuchtenberg , a daughter of Maximilian, Duke of Leuchtenberg and Grand Duchess Maria Nikolaevna .

Princess Marie-Louise of Hanover was a daughter of Ernest Augustus, Crown Prince of Hanover, claimant of the annexed Kingdom of Hanover.

== Marriage ==
On 17 September 1924, she married her fourth cousin Prince Wolfgang of Hesse (1896–1989). They had no children.

== Death ==
Princess Marie Alexandra was killed in an attack by the U.S. Army Air Forces during an air-raid on Frankfurt am Main on 29–30 January 1944 during World War II. She and seven other women, who were aid workers, were killed when the cellar, in which they had taken refuge, collapsed under the weight of the building, rendering Marie Alexandra's body barely recognisable.

== Ancestry ==
Ancestors of Princess Marie Alexandra of Baden

8. Leopold, Grand Duke of Baden
4. Prince William of Baden
9. Princess Sophie of Sweden
2. Prince Maximilian of Baden
10. Maximilian de Beauharnais, 3rd Duke of Leuchtenberg
5. Princess Maria Maximilianovna of Leuchtenberg
11. Grand Duchess Maria Nikolaevna of Russia
1. Princess Marie Alexandra of Baden
12. George V of Hanover
6. Ernest Augustus, Crown Prince of Hanover
13. Princess Marie of Saxe-Altenburg
3. Princess Marie Louise of Hanover
14. Christian IX of Denmark
7. Princess Thyra of Denmark
15. Princess Louise of Hesse-Kassel
