= Bernd von Doering =

- Born: Wilhelm Konrad Rodrigo Bernd von Doering; 16 January 1903; Cmachowo, Kreis Samter, Regierungsbezirk Posen, Province of Posen, Kingdom of Prussia, German Empire
- Died: 7 July 1944 (aged 41); South of Florence, Italian Social Republic
- Relatives: ∞ 1929 Eleonore Wrede; 4 children
- Military career
- Allegiance: Weimar Republic; Nazi Germany
- Branch: Reichswehr; Heer
- Service years: 1920–45
- Rank: Generalmajor
- Unit: Panzergrenadier-Regiment 79
- Commands: II./Schützen-Regiment 79; Panzergrenadier-Regiment 79
- Conflicts: World War II: Battle of France; Invasion of Yugoslavia; Battle of Greece; Operation Barbarossa; Battle of Uman; Battle of Kiev (1941); Battle of Rostov (1941); Allied invasion of Italy †
- Awards: Knight's Cross of the Iron Cross

Wilhelm Konrad Rodrigo Bernd von Doering (16 January 1903 – 7 July 1944) was a German officer and highly decorated Generalmajor in the Wehrmacht during World War II. He was also a recipient of the Knight's Cross of the Iron Cross.

== Knight's Cross ==
The following wartime excerpt describes why Major von Doering would be awarded the Knight's Cross:

“Major von Doering and his battalion eliminated strong elements of a fleeing enemy battalion during the forest battles south of Sedan at Mont Damion and Mont du Cygne from the 17 May 1940 onwards. The subsequent pursuit battles led to the Maas river at Sepvigny. The bridge site at Bourcy was taken despite the presence of a strong garrison, and this victory meant that von Doering's battalion became the first formation of the 16th Infantry Division to reach the southern bank of the Maas. Successful village combat took place in the continued combat south of the Maas, during which 350 French prisoners of war were taken.”

== Death ==
Colonel von Doering, First Adjutant to the Commander-in-Chief Southwest (Generalfeldmarschall Albert Kesselring) since 22 November 1943, was killed in action by shrapnel on the Arno line, 2 km south of Florence and north of Poggibonsi. The main line of resistance near Siena and Poggibonsi was held by the 4th Parachute Division. However, the main battle front was forced to retreat towards Florence during July 1944. Von Doering's body was transported to Arco, and then on to Gardone Riviera (Lake Garda), where he was given a formal burial. On 2 August 1944, he was posthumously promoted to Major General, effective 1 July 1944.

== Personal life ==
Bernd von Doering was the son of Wilhelm von Doering and Duchess Mathila Fink of Finkenstein.

In 1929 he married Eleonore Werde (born 17 October 1908). They had four children together, under the following two daughters:

- Angela Mathilde Agathe von Doering (12 August 1940 – 11 April 1991) She was born in Goslar and died in Hanover. She was married twice: Her first marriage was to Hans-Peter Schmiedler (*13 March 1914), but they divorced before 1965. Her second marriage was to Otto Adolf von Hesse-Kassel (1937–1998), whom she married civilly on 5 April 1965 in Munich and religiously a day later in Trostberg. He was the son of Prince Philip, Landgrave of Hesse, who was the Grandson of the German Emperor Friedrich of Prussia and the Great-Grandson of Queen Victoria of England over his maternal side. They divorced on 3 February 1969, without issue. Afterwards she married Wilbrand von Reden (*born 1 October 1937).
- Monika von Doering (born 15 September 1941) She was born in Danzig and married Dr. Manfred Freiherr von Crailsheim with whom she had two children. They later divorced.

== Awards and decorations ==
- Wehrmacht Long Service Award, 4th to 2nd Class (18-year Service Cross)
- West Wall Medal
- Iron Cross (1939), 2nd and 1st Class
  - 2nd Class on 25 May 1940
  - 1st Class on 4 June 1940
- Infantry Assault Badge in Silver on 4 November 1940
- Wound Badge (1939) in Black on 4 August 1941
- Winter Battle in the East 1941–42 Medal on 16 September 1942
- Knight's Cross of the Iron Cross on 30 November 1940 as Major and Commander of the II. Battalion/Schützen-Regiment 79/16. Panzer-Division
