= Prince Frederick Charles of Hesse =

King-elect of Finland in 1918

Frederick Charles
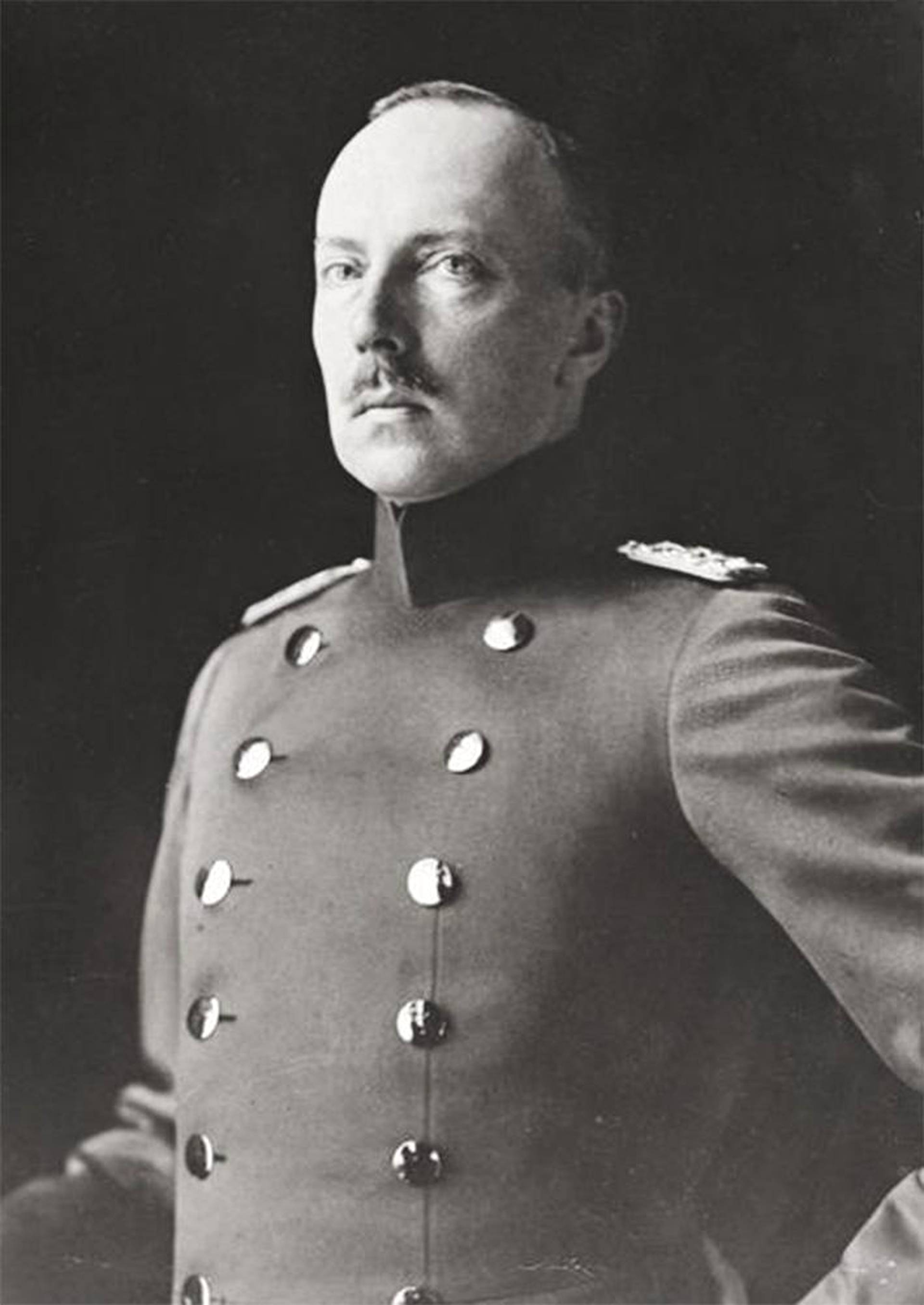
- Frederick Charles c. 1917

King-elect of Finland
- Reign: 9 October 1918 – 14 December 1918 (never reigned)
- Predecessor: Monarchy established; Nicholas II as Grand Duke of Finland
- Successor: Monarchy abolished; Kaarlo Juho Ståhlberg as de facto President of Finland
- Regent: P. E. Svinhufvud; C. G. E. Mannerheim

Head of the House of Hesse
- Tenure: 16 March 1925 – 28 May 1940
- Predecessor: Alexander Frederick
- Successor: Philipp
- Born: 1 May 1868; Panker Castle, Plön, Kingdom of Prussia
- Died: 28 May 1940 (aged 72); Kassel, Nazi Germany
- Burial: Schloss Friedrichshof, Kronberg im Taunus, Germany
- Spouse: Princess Margaret of Prussia (m. 1893)
- Issue Detail: Prince Friedrich Wilhelm; Prince Maximilian; Philipp, Landgrave of Hesse; Prince Wolfgang; Prince Christoph; Prince Richard
Names
- Frederick Charles Louis Constantine
- House: Hesse-Kassel
- Father: Frederick William, Landgrave of Hesse
- Mother: Princess Anna of Prussia
- Military service
- Allegiance: German Empire
- Branch: Imperial German Army
- Service years: c. 1893, 1899–1911, 1914
- Rank: General der Infanterie
- Conflicts: World War I; Western Front; Battle of the Ardennes; First Battle of the Marne (WIA)

Frederick Charles Louis Constantine, Prince and Landgrave of Hesse (German: Friedrich Karl Ludwig Konstantin Prinz und Landgraf von Hessen-Kassel; Finnish: Fredrik Kaarle; 1 May 1868 – 28 May 1940), was the brother-in-law of the German Emperor, Wilhelm II. He was elected King of Finland on 9 October 1918, but renounced the throne on 14 December 1918.

== Early life ==
Frederick was born at his family's Panker Castle, in Plön, Holstein. He was the third son of Frederick William of Hesse, Landgrave of Hesse, and his second wife Princess Anna of Prussia, daughter of Prince Charles of Prussia and Princess Marie Louise of Saxe-Weimar-Eisenach. Frederick William, a Danish military officer, had been one (and perhaps the foremost) of the candidates of Christian VIII of Denmark in the 1840s to succeed to the Danish throne if the latter's male line died out, but renounced his rights to the throne in 1851 in favor of his aunt, Louise. Frederick William was of practically Danish upbringing, having lived all his life in Denmark, but in 1875, when the senior branch of Hesse-Kassel became extinct, he settled in northern Germany, where the House had substantial landholdings.

He was known as Fischy to some of his family members. As a boy he was tutored, and attended secondary school in Wiesbaden, Hanau, and Frankfurt. Upon graduation he entered university in Freiburg, and studied archaeology, history, and art history.

== Early military career ==
After going to university for a few semesters, Frederick Charles joined the Imperial German Army at 17 years old, following a family tradition of military service. He joined the Guard Dragoon Regiment in Berlin, yet took leave almost immediately due to his marriage.

== Marriage and issue ==
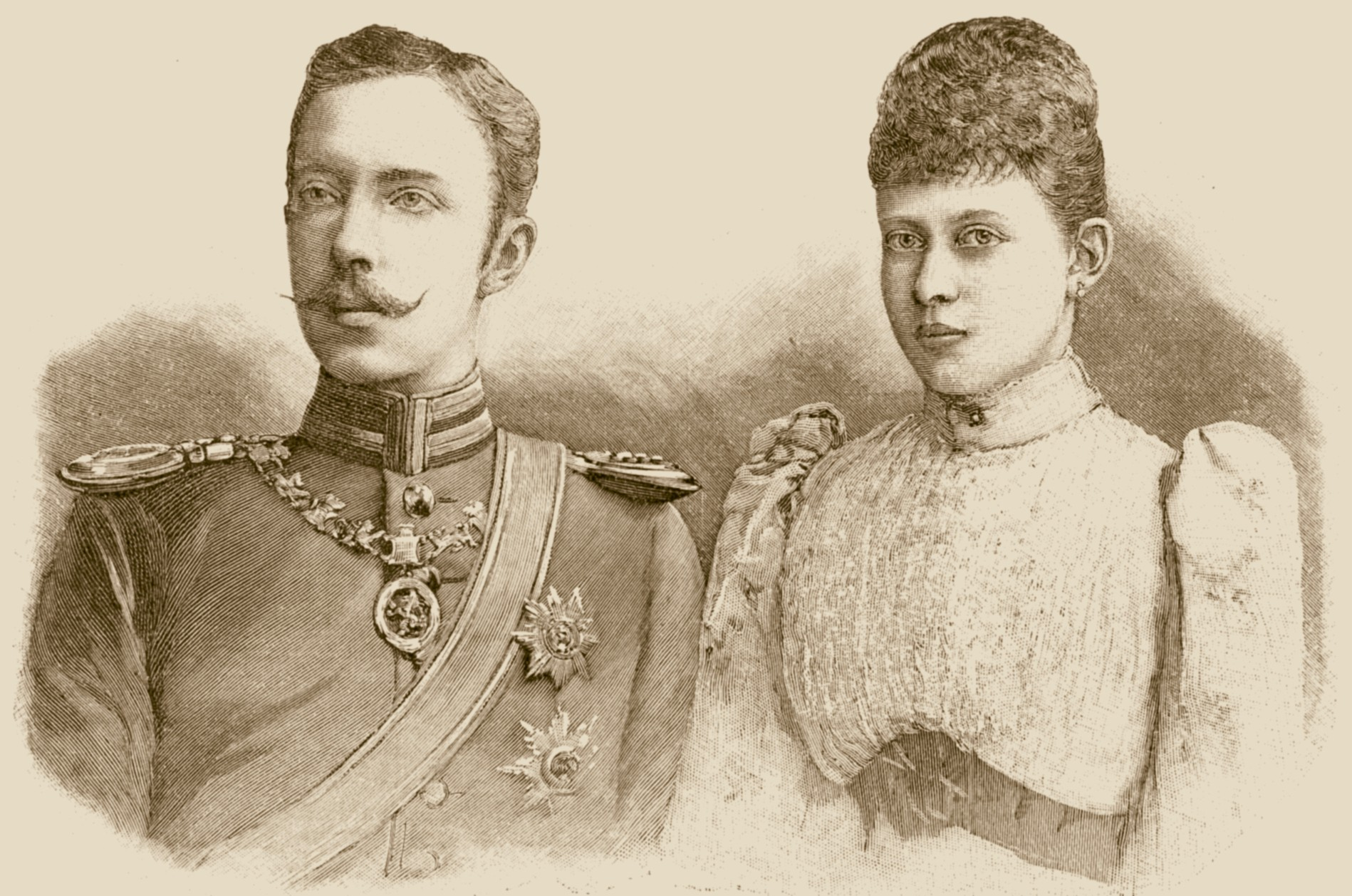
Prince Frederick Charles and his wife Princess Margaret of Prussia in 1893

On 25 January 1893, Frederick Charles married his second cousin, Princess Margaret of Prussia, youngest sister of Kaiser Wilhelm II and a granddaughter of Queen Victoria of the United Kingdom. They had six sons, including two sets of twins:

- Friedrich Wilhelm of Hesse (23 November 1893 – 12 September 1916), died in World War I, during the Dobrujan campaign
- Maximilian Friedrich Wilhelm Georg (20 October 1894 – 13 October 1914), died in World War I
- Philipp, Landgrave of Hesse (1896–1980), twin with his brother Wolfgang; married Princess Mafalda of Savoy (1902–1944, Buchenwald), daughter of King Victor Emmanuel III of Italy and had issue.
- Prince Wolfgang of Hesse (1896–1989), twin with his brother Philipp. He was the designated Crown Prince of Finland officially until 14 December 1918. He married Princess Marie Alexandra of Baden, no issue
- Prince Christoph Ernst August of Hesse (1901–1943), twin with his brother Richard. An SS officer who died in active service during World War II, he married Princess Sophie of Greece and Denmark (sister of Prince Philip, Duke of Edinburgh) and had issue.
- Prince Richard Wilhelm Leopold (1901–1969), twin with his brother Christoph; unmarried

Upon their father's death in 1884, Frederick's eldest brother Frederick William became the head of the House of Hesse, and afterwards his next brother Alexander.

== Later military career and World War I ==
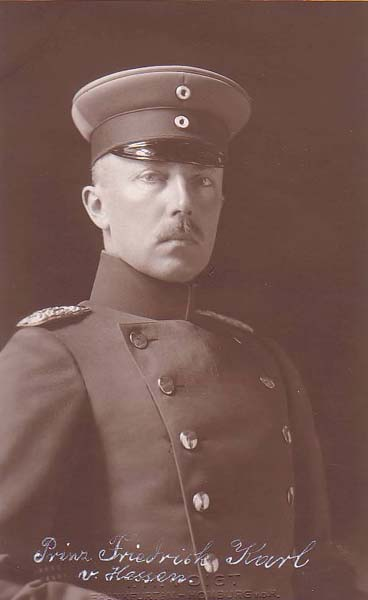
Frederick Charles in army uniform, date unknown

Frederick Charles returned to army service in 1899, then in the 'Electoral Hessian Infantry Regiment 81' in Frankfurt. This placement was by his own request, and drew scrutiny for not being 'elite' or Prussian. Nonetheless, Frederick held the rank of captain, and, following regimental tradition, did not participate in lavish social gatherings typical of the noble and royal class, instead preferring to spend time in his library or with his family. In 1911 he became the regiment's commander, however he left the army once more that year over a leadership dispute with general Hermann von Eichhorn.

In August 1914, Frederick rejoined the army once more, becoming commander of the Frankfurt Regiment with the rank of lieutenant general. He led his regiment in combat in the First World War, participating first in the Battle of the Ardennes. When a flagbearer was wounded while invading the Belgian village of Bertrix, Frederick Charles picked up the standard and lead a charge; he would also frequently don a long officer's coat with red lining, which made him visible among both friendly and enemy troops. He was wounded at Étrepy during the First Battle of the Marne, likely because of how visible his attire was, and had to spend the rest of the war at Friedrichshof Castle recovering from his injuries. His son Maximilian died in the same conflict in October, which broke the spirit of the hospitalized Frederick (The later death of his other son, Friedrich, in the same war, would leave him dejected further yet).

He was made General der Infanterie on 24 December 1914.

== The Finnish throne ==
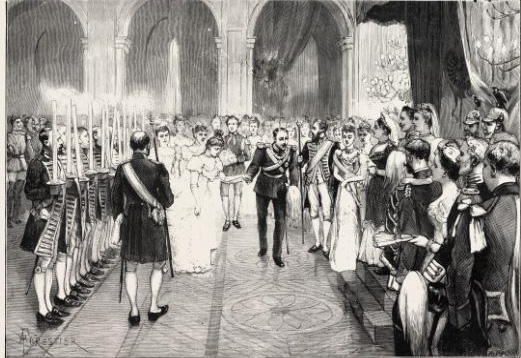
The wedding of Prince Frederick Charles of Hesse and Princess Margaret of Prussia.

Frederick Charles was elected the King of Finland by the Parliament of Finland on 9 October 1918. However, with the end of World War I, in light of his German birth (and despite his Danish roots through his paternal grandmother) and the abdication of Emperor Wilhelm II of Germany ending monarchies in Germany, the arrangement was quickly considered untenable by influential Finns of the time and by Frederick Charles himself. Not much is known of the official stance of the victorious Allied Powers. Frederick Charles renounced the throne on 14 December 1918, without ever arriving in the country, much less taking up his position. Finland's subsequent elections were a victory for anti-monarchists, and the parliament quickly adopted a republican constitution.

The electoral document refers to Prince Frederick Charles with the Finnish name Fredrik Kaarle. Other proposals for a Finnish regnal name included Kaarle and Kaarlo. The regnal name "Väinö I", which lived on in the memory of the Finns, probably came from a newspaper causerie: in 1927 in Suomen Sosialidemokraatti, "Hesekiel" (Heikki Välisalmi) claimed Väinö had been the intended name; already in 1918 in Uusi Päivä, "Olli" (Väinö Nuorteva) had suggested "Ilmari, Väinö, Kauko, Jouko, Usko, Jaska?".

== Later life ==
Landgrave Alexander Frederick of Hesse abdicated as the head of the House of Hesse on 16 March 1925, and was succeeded by Frederick Charles, his younger brother.

At Frederick's death, his eldest surviving son, Philipp, succeeded him as head.

However, according to certain family documents and correspondence, his successor as King of Finland would have been his second surviving son Prince Wolfgang of Hesse (1896–1989), apparently because Philipp was already the designated heir of the rights over the Electorate of Hesse, but certainly because Wolfgang was with his parents in 1918 and ready to travel to Finland, where a wedding to a Finnish lady was already in preparation for the coming crown prince. Philipp was in the military and unable to be contacted at the time.

== Honours ==
- Grand Duchy of Hesse:
  - Knight of the Golden Lion, with Collar, 4 August 1885
  - Grand Cross of the Ludwig Order, 1 May 1892
  - Wedding Medal of Grand Duke Ernst Ludwig and Grand Duchess Victoria Melita, 1894
- Duchy of Anhalt: Grand Cross of the Order of Albert the Bear, 1886
- Principality of Bulgaria: Grand Cross of St. Alexander
- Kingdom of Greece: Grand Cross of the Redeemer
- Oldenburg: Grand Cross of the Order of Duke Peter Friedrich Ludwig, with Golden Crown
- Kingdom of Prussia:
  - Knight of the Black Eagle, 24 December 1892; with Collar, 17 January 1893
  - Grand Cross of the Red Eagle
- Saxe-Weimar-Eisenach: Grand Cross of the White Falcon, 1893
- Denmark: Knight of the Elephant, with Collar, 24 June 1895
- United Kingdom: Honorary Grand Cross of the Bath (civil), 22 June 1897
- Baden: Knight of the House Order of Fidelity, 1902

== Ancestry ==
Ancestors of Prince Frederick Charles of Hesse

8. Prince Frederick of Hesse-Kassel
4. Prince William of Hesse-Kassel
9. Princess Caroline of Nassau-Usingen
2. Frederick William II, Landgrave of Hesse
10. Frederick, Hereditary Prince of Denmark
5. Princess Charlotte of Denmark
11. Duchess Sophia Frederica of Mecklenburg-Schwerin
1. Frederick Charles, Landgrave of Hesse
12. Frederick William III of Prussia
6. Prince Charles of Prussia
13. Duchess Louise of Mecklenburg-Strelitz
3. Princess Anna of Prussia
14. Charles Frederick, Grand Duke of Saxe-Weimar-Eisenach
7. Princess Marie of Saxe-Weimar-Eisenach
15. Grand Duchess Maria Pavlovna of Russia

== See also ==
- List of Finnish monarchs
- Rulers of Hesse
- Archduke Charles Stephen of Austria
- Mindaugas II of Lithuania

Prince Frederick Charles of Hesse House of Hesse-Kassel Born: 1 May 1868 Died: 28 May 1940
Regnal titles
Preceded by Alexander Frederick	Head of the House of Hesse	Succeeded by Philipp
