= Princess Mafalda of Savoy =

Landgravine of Hesse (1902–1944)

Princess Mafalda
- Landgravine of Hesse
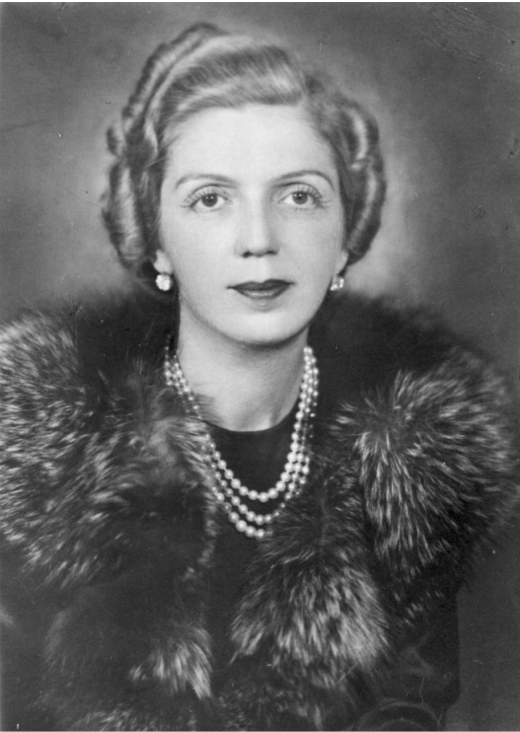
- Princess Mafalda in 1940
- Born: 19 November 1902; Rome, Kingdom of Italy
- Died: 28 August 1944 (aged 41); Buchenwald Concentration Camp, Weimar, Nazi Germany
- Burial: Kronberg Castle, Hesse
- Spouse: Philipp, Landgrave of Hesse (m. 1925)
- Issue: Prince Moritz; Prince Heinrich; Prince Otto; Princess Elisabeth
Names
- Mafalda Maria Elisabetta Anna Romana
- House: Savoy
- Father: Victor Emmanuel III of Italy
- Mother: Elena of Montenegro

Princess Mafalda of Savoy (19 November 1902 – 28 August 1944) was the second daughter of King Victor Emmanuel III of Italy and his wife Elena of Montenegro. In 1925, at the age of 22, she married the Landgrave of Hesse, Philipp. In 1943, during World War II, she was imprisoned in Buchenwald concentration camp, where she died. The future King Umberto II of Italy was her younger brother.

Mafalda was born a princess of Savoy. She was the second child and daughter of King Victor Emmanuel III of Italy and Elena of Montenegro. She was very close to her mother, and went with her mother to visit Italian military hospitals during World War I. In 1925, Mafalda married Philipp, Landgrave of Hesse. They had four children together.

In 1943, during World War II, Mafalda was tricked into going to the German Embassy, under the impression that her husband needed to speak to her. However, her husband was already imprisoned in a concentration camp, while her children had been given sanctuary in the Vatican. On her arrival at the Embassy, Mafalda was arrested and transported to Munich for questioning, then to Berlin, and finally to Buchenwald.

On 24 August 1944, the Allies bombed Buchenwald's ammunition factory. Mafalda suffered from burns on her left arm and face, and was found covered up to her neck in debris. Her arm soon became infected, and she had an operation done. The operation resulted in her death from blood loss during the night of 28 August.

== Early life: 1902–1925 ==
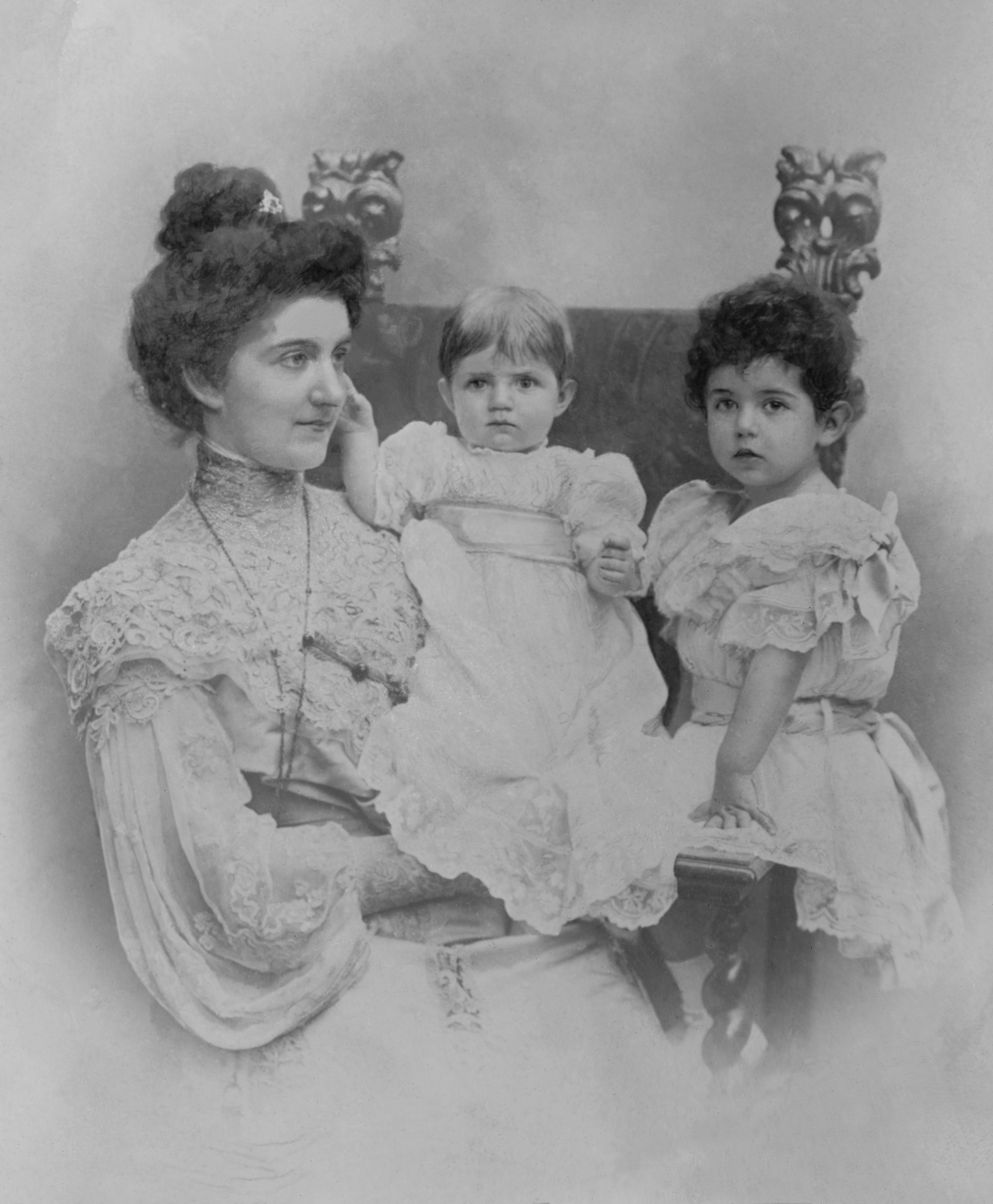
Mafalda as a child, with her mother Queen Elena and sister Princess Yolanda

Mafalda Maria Elisabetta Anna Romana was born on 19 November 1902 in Rome, and was nicknamed "Muti". She was the second child born to King Victor Emmanuel III and Queen Elena of Italy. She was baptized at the Quirinal Palace on 15 December 1902. She had four siblings: Yolanda, Umberto, Giovanna, and Maria Francesca.

During her childhood, she was closest to her mother, from whom she inherited a love for music and the arts. During World War I, she accompanied her mother on her visits to Italian military hospitals. In 1919, she accompanied her mother, her sister Yolanda, and the Duchess of Aosta to Paris, France, where the Prince of Wales also was.

== Marriage: 1925–1943 ==
On 23 September 1925, at Racconigi Castle, in the presence of the whole royal family Mafalda married Prince Philipp of Hesse, Landgrave of Hesse-Kassel and grandson of German Emperor Frederick III, whom she had met at a garden party earlier in 1925. Prince Philipp and his brother Christoph were members of the Nazi Party and Mafalda adopted German citizenship.

Prince Philipp's marriage to Princess Mafalda put him in position to act as intermediary between the National Socialist government in Germany (ruling since 1933) and the Fascist government in Italy, ruling since 1922. On the evening of 26 March 1935 she was present at an informal diplomatic dinner given by Adolf Hitler in the Reich President's House in Berlin. She sat next to Anthony Eden. The couple were also frequent guests at Hermann Göring's country residence and had links to many important people in Italian society, including royals, politicians and the papacy.

However, during World War II, Adolf Hitler believed Princess Mafalda was working against the war effort; he called her the "blackest carrion in the Italian royal house". So did Hitler's Minister of Propaganda Joseph Goebbels, who called her "the biggest bitch (grösste Rabenaas) in the entire Italian royal house".

== Imprisonment and death: 1943–1944 ==
The relationship between Prince Philipp and Hitler was beginning to sour by the spring of 1943. Although he initially worked for Hitler, Prince Philipp tried to resign, but he was prevented. He, reportedly, provided passports for Jews to allow them to flee to the Netherlands.

Early in September 1943, Princess Mafalda travelled to Bulgaria to attend the funeral of her brother-in-law, King Boris III. While there, she was informed of Italy's surrender to the Allied Powers, that her husband was being held under house arrest in Bavaria, and that her children had been given sanctuary in the Vatican. The Gestapo ordered her arrest, and on 23 September she received a telephone call from Hauptsturmführer Karl Hass at the German High Command, who told her that he had an important message from her husband. On her arrival at the German embassy, Mafalda was arrested, ostensibly for subversive activities. Princess Mafalda was transported to Munich for questioning, then to Berlin, and finally to Buchenwald concentration camp. The Italian prisoners at the Buchenwald concentration camp recognized her, and stated that she shared her food with other prisoners.

On 24 August 1944, the Allies bombed an ammunition factory inside Buchenwald. Some four hundred prisoners were killed and Princess Mafalda was seriously wounded: she had been housed in a unit adjacent to the bombed factory, and when the attack occurred she was buried up to her neck in debris and suffered severe burns to her left arm. She said, "I’m dying. Remember me not as a princess but as your Italian sister."

The conditions of the labour camp caused her arm to become infected as a result, and the medical staff at the facility amputated it; she bled profusely during the operation and never regained consciousness. She died during the night of 26–27 August 1944; her body was reburied after the war at Kronberg Castle in Hesse.

Eugen Kogon, author of The Theory and Practice of Hell – The German Concentration Camps and the System Behind Them (1950), adds more details of Mafalda's death – some of it in conflict with the previous account. After the air raid of 24 August 1944, the princess was wounded in the arm and Dr. Schiedlausky, camp medical office, performed the arm amputation, but his patient did not survive due to loss of blood. Her naked body was dumped into the crematorium, where Father Joseph Thyl dug it out of the body heap, covered her up, and arranged for speedy cremation. Thyl cut off a lock of the princess's hair, which was smuggled out of camp to be kept in Jena, until it could be sent on to her German relatives. Her death was not confirmed until after Germany's surrender to the Allies in 1945.

== Legacy ==
In 1995, the Italian government honored Princess Mafalda with her image on a postal stamp.

Mafaldine ("little Mafalda"), a variety of flat durum wheat pasta, are named after her.

== Children ==
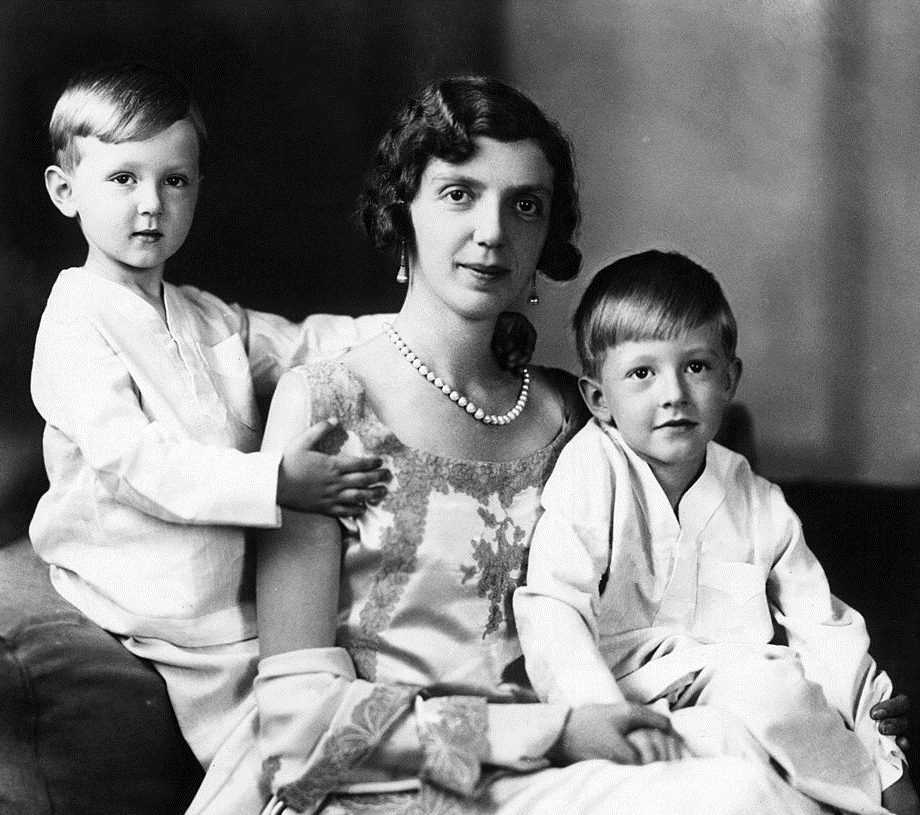
Princess Mafalda with sons Moritz and Heinrich in the 1931

Princess Mafalda married Philipp, Landgrave of Hesse, on 23 September 1925 (civilly and religiously) at Racconigi Castle near Turin. They had 4 children:

1. Moritz Friedrich Karl Emanuel Humbert (6 August 1926 – 23 May 2013); married on 1 June 1964 (civilly) and on 3 June 1964 (religiously) in Kronberg to Princess Tatiana of Sayn-Wittgenstein-Berleburg (born 31 July 1940), with issue (div. 16 October 1974).
2. Heinrich Wilhelm Konstantin Viktor Franz (30 October 1927 – 18 November 1999); unmarried, without issue.
3. Otto Adolf (3 June 1937 – 3 January 1998); married first on 5 April 1965 (civilly) in Munich and on 6 April 1965 (religiously) in Trostberg to Angela Mathilde Agathe von Doering (12 August 1940 Goslar – 11 April 1991 Hanover), daughter of general Bernd von Doering, without issue (div. 3 February 1969). Married secondly on 28 December 1988 to Elisabeth Marga Dorothea Bönker (31 Jan 1944 Rumburg, Czechoslovakia – 12 April 2013), without issue (div. 1994).
4. Elisabeth Margarethe Elena Johanna Maria Jolanda Polyxene (born 8 October 1940); married on 26 February 1962 (civilly) and on 28 February 1962 (religiously) in Frankfurt am Main to Count Friedrich Karl von Oppersdorf (30 January 1925 Głogówek – 11 January 1985 Gravenbruch), with issue.

== Honours ==
- (Kingdom of Italy) House of Savoy: Dame Cordon of the Royal Order of Saints Maurice and Lazarus
- Sovereign Military Order of Malta: Dame Grand Cross of Honour and Devotion of the Sovereign Military Order of Malta, 3rd First Class

== Ancestry ==
Ancestors of Princess Mafalda of Savoy

8. Victor Emmanuel II of Italy
4. Umberto I of Italy
9. Archduchess Adelaide of Austria
2. Victor Emmanuel III of Italy
10. Prince Ferdinand, Duke of Genoa
5. Princess Margherita of Savoy
11. Princess Elisabeth of Saxony
1. Princess Mafalda of Savoy
12. Mirko Petrović-Njegoš, Grand Duke of Grahovo
6. Nicholas I of Montenegro
13. Anastasija Martinović
3. Princess Elena of Montenegro
14. Duke Petar Vukotić
7. Milena Vukotić
15. Jelena Voivodić

== Bibliography ==
- Hanson, Edward W. (2017). The Wandering Princess: Princess Helene of France, Duchess of Aosta 1871-1951. Fonthill Media. ISBN 978-1781555927.
