= Prince Andrew of Yugoslavia =

Yugoslav prince (1929–1990)

Prince Andrew
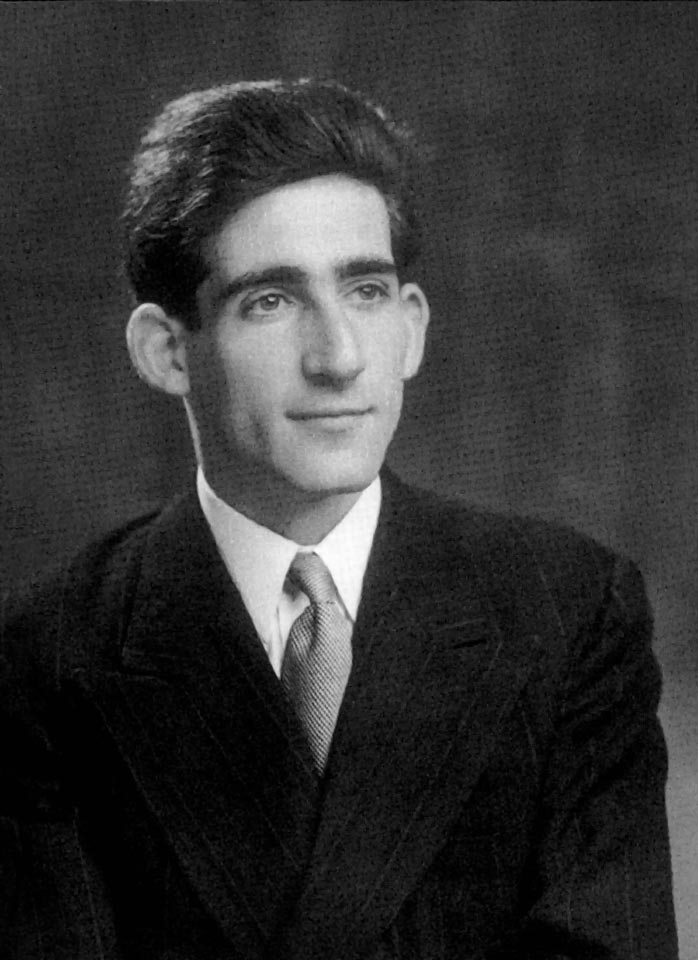
- Born: 28 June 1929; Bled, Kingdom of Serbs, Croats and Slovenes (now Slovenia)
- Died: 7 May 1990 (aged 60); Irvine, California, U.S.
- Burial: New Gračanica Monastery, Third Lake, Illinois (1990–2013); Saint George's Church, Oplenac (since 2013)
- Spouse: Princess Christina of Hesse (m. 1956; div. 1962) Princess Kira Melita of Leiningen (m. 1963; div. 1972) Eva Maria Andjelkovich (m. 1974)
- Issue: Princess Maria Tatiana; Prince Christopher; Princess Lavinia Marie; Prince Karl Vladimir; Prince Dimitri
- House: Karađorđević
- Father: Alexander I of Yugoslavia
- Mother: Maria of Yugoslavia

Prince Andrew of Yugoslavia (Serbian Cyrillic: Андреј Карађорђевић; 28 June 1929 – 7 May 1990) was the youngest child of King Alexander I of Yugoslavia and Maria of Yugoslavia.

== Personal life ==
In 1934, when he was only five, Prince Andrew's father, Alexander I, was assassinated and his elder brother Peter succeeded to the throne as King Peter II of Yugoslavia.

After the fall of the monarchy in Yugoslavia, Prince Andrew went into exile in London, where, after graduating in mathematics from Clare College, Cambridge University, he became an insurance broker.

In 1947, Prince Andrew was a guest at the wedding of Princess Elizabeth and Philip Mountbatten.

Andrew was a prominent Rotarian.

=== Marriages and issue ===
On 2 August 1956, he married his third cousin once removed Princess Christina of Hesse (10 January 1933 – 21 November 2011), in Kronberg im Taunus, Germany. She was the eldest child of Prince Christoph of Hesse and Princess Sophie of Greece and Denmark (elder sister of Prince Philip, Duke of Edinburgh, the husband of Queen Elizabeth II). They had two children, both of whom were godchildren of their uncle the Duke of Edinburgh:

- Princess Maria Tatiana ("Tania") of Yugoslavia (18 July 1957), married 30 June 1990 Gregory Per Edward Anthony Michael Thune-Larsen. They had two daughters:
  - Sonia Tatiana Thune-Larsen (29 October 1992).
  - Olga Kristin Thune-Larsen (26 October 1995).
- Prince Christopher (4 February 1960 – 14 May 1994), a science teacher who died in a bicycle accident.

The couple divorced in London on 31 May 1962.

On 18 September 1963, he married his second cousin Princess Kira Melita of Leiningen (18 July 1930 – 24 September 2005), daughter of Karl, Prince of Leiningen, and Grand Duchess Maria Kirillovna of Russia. They had three children:

- Princess Lavinia Marie of Yugoslavia (18 October 1961), born while her father was still married to Princess Christina of Hesse and registered as Lavinia Maria Lane; she was adopted legally by her parents on 15 November 1965, enabling her to be recognized a legitimate member of the Royal House of Yugoslavia. Married firstly 20 May 1989 Erastos Dimitrios Sidiropoulos (divorced 14 June 1993) and secondly on 4 October 1998 Austin Prichard-Levy (1953–2017). They had three children:
  - Nadya Marie George (11 December 1987), illegitimate; fathered by Roy Rexford Finnimore, her surname was changed to Sidiropoulos in 1990.
  - Andrej Aristotle Sidiropoulos (22 February 1990).
  - Luca Orlando Christopher Prichard-Levy (14 February 2000).
- Prince Karl Vladimir Cyril Andrej of Yugoslavia (11 March 1964), married 18 April 2000 Brigitte Müller.
- Prince Dimitri Ivan Mihailo of Yugoslavia (21 April 1965).

They were divorced in Frankfurt am Main on 10 July 1972.

Andrej married thirdly Eva Maria Anđelković, (26 August 1926 – 13 December 2020) on 30 March 1974 in Palm Springs, California, USA. The couple had no issue.

== Death ==
Andrew was found dead in his car in Irvine, California, U.S., on 7 May 1990. The death was determined to be suicide by carbon monoxide. His remains were initially buried in New Gračanica Monastery, Third Lake, Illinois. They remained there until 2013, when they were returned to Serbia and buried in Saint George's Church, Oplenac, on 26 May 2013.

== Ancestry ==
Andrew's paternal grandparents were King Peter I of Serbia and Princess Zorka of Montenegro, while his maternal grandparents were King Ferdinand of Romania and Princess Marie of Edinburgh.

Ancestors of Prince Andrew of Yugoslavia

16. Karađorđe Petrović
8. Alexander Karađorđević, Prince of Serbia
17. Jelena Jovanović
4. Peter I of Serbia
18. Jevrem Nenadović
9. Persida Nenadović
19. Jovanka Milovanović
2. Alexander I of Yugoslavia
20. Mirko Petrović-Njegoš
10. Nicholas I of Montenegro
21. Anastasija Martinović
5. Princess Zorka of Montenegro
22. Petar Vukotić
11. Milena Vukotić
23. Jelena Vojvodić
1. Prince Andrew of Yugoslavia
24. Karl Anton, Prince of Hohenzollern
12. Leopold, Prince of Hohenzollern
25. Princess Josephine of Baden
6. Ferdinand I of Romania
26. Ferdinand II of Portugal
13. Infanta Antónia of Portugal
27. Maria II of Portugal
3. Princess Maria of Romania
28. Prince Albert of Saxe-Coburg and Gotha
14. Alfred, Duke of Saxe-Coburg and Gotha
29. Victoria of the United Kingdom
7. Princess Marie of Edinburgh
30. Alexander II of Russia
15. Grand Duchess Maria Alexandrovna of Russia
31. Princess Marie of Hesse and by Rhine

== See also ==
- List of Rotarians
