= Anđelić =

Origin
- Language: Serbo-Croatian

Anđelić, also written Andjelić or Andjelic, is a surname from the Balkans. It may refer to:

- Alex Andjelic (1940–2021), Serbian ice hockey coach
- Božo Anđelić (born 1992), Montenegrin handball player
- Branislav Andjelić (born 1959), Serbian Internet pioneer, economist and politician
- David Andjelic (born 1994), Serbian rugby league footballer
- German Anđelić (1822–1888), bishop of Bačka and Serbian patriarch
- Kića Anđelić, Serbian trumpeter, member of Deca Loših Muzičara
- Nataša Anđelić (born 1977), Serbian basketball player
- Pavao Anđelić (1920–1985), Yugoslav historian and archaeologist
- Tatomir Anđelić (1903–1993), Serbian mathematician and expert in mechanics

== See also ==
- Anđelović
