= Prince Karl of Hesse =

German aristocrat (1937–2022)

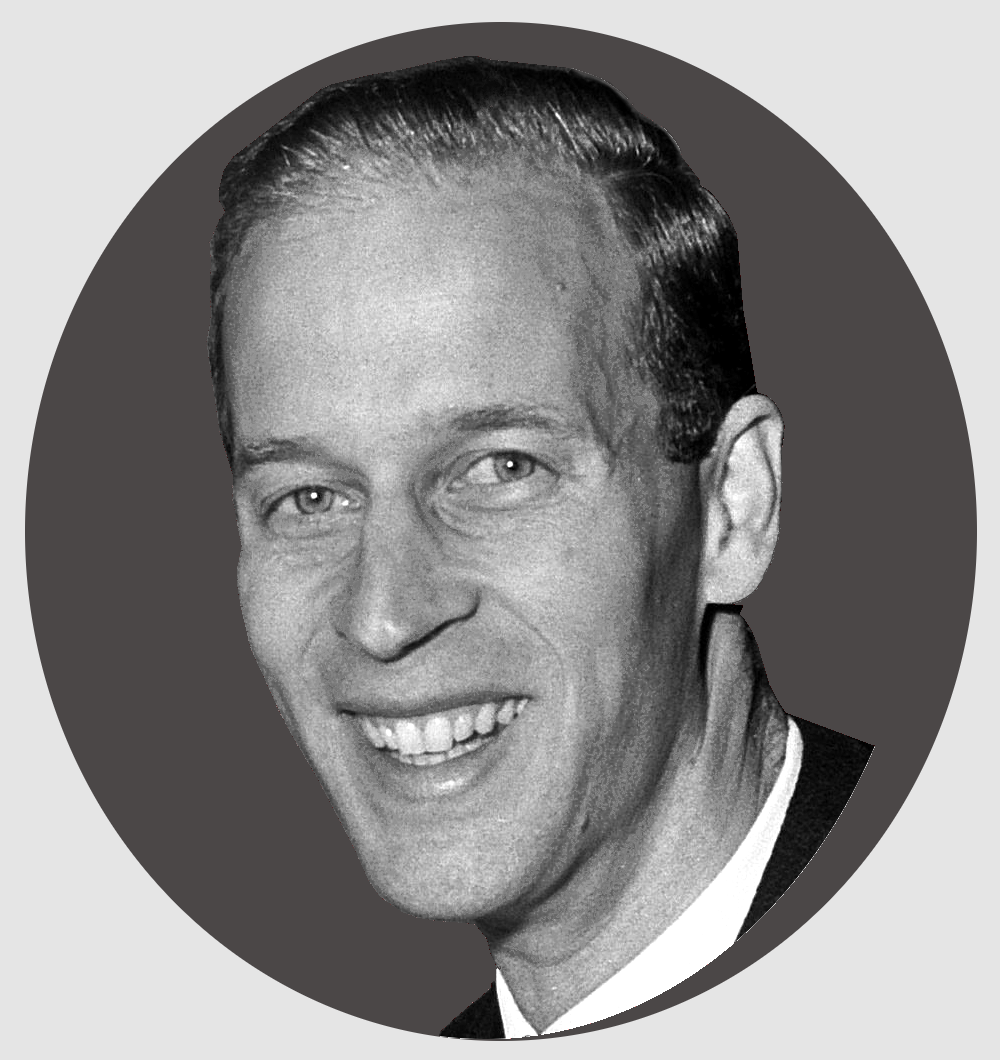
- Karl in 1966
- Born: 26 March 1937; Berlin, Nazi Germany
- Died: 23 March 2022 (aged 84); Munich, Germany
- Spouse: Countess Yvonne Szapáry (m. 1966)
- Issue: Prince Christoph; Princess Irina, Countess of Schönburg-Glauchau
Names
- Karl Adolf Andreas
- House: Hesse-Kassel
- Father: Prince Christoph of Hesse
- Mother: Princess Sophie of Greece and Denmark

Karl Adolf Andreas Prinz von Hesse (German: Karl Adolf Andreas Prinz von Hessen; 26 March 1937 – 23 March 2022) was a member of the German electoral House of Hesse-Kassel. He was a first cousin of King Charles III of the United Kingdom through his uncle Prince Philip.

== Early life and ancestry ==
Born on 26 March 1937 in Berlin, into an elder line of the House of Hesse, a house directly descended from the House of Brabant, Karl Adolf Andreas was the eldest son of Prince Christoph of Hesse and his wife, Princess Sophie of Greece and Denmark, youngest sister of Prince Philip, Duke of Edinburgh. At the time of his birth, his parents had close ties with the Nazi regime and the child was given Adolf among his first names in honor of Adolf Hitler.

== Biography ==
The outbreak of the Second World War deprived Karl of his father, who enlisted in the German army in the first months of the conflict and who disappeared in an air accident in 1943. In 1946, his mother was married again to Prince George William of Hanover, maternal grandson of Wilhelm II. After losing his father at an early age, Karl was later adopted by one of his paternal uncles, Prince Wolfgang of Hesse, in 1952.

Related to most European dynasties, Karl participated in the major events of the gotha. In 1954, he and his family were invited to take part in the Cruise of the Kings, organized by King Paul of Greece and his wife Queen Frederica. In 1960, Karl was invited to Stockholm on the occasion of a grand ball organized in honor of the granddaughters of King Gustaf VI Adolf of Sweden.

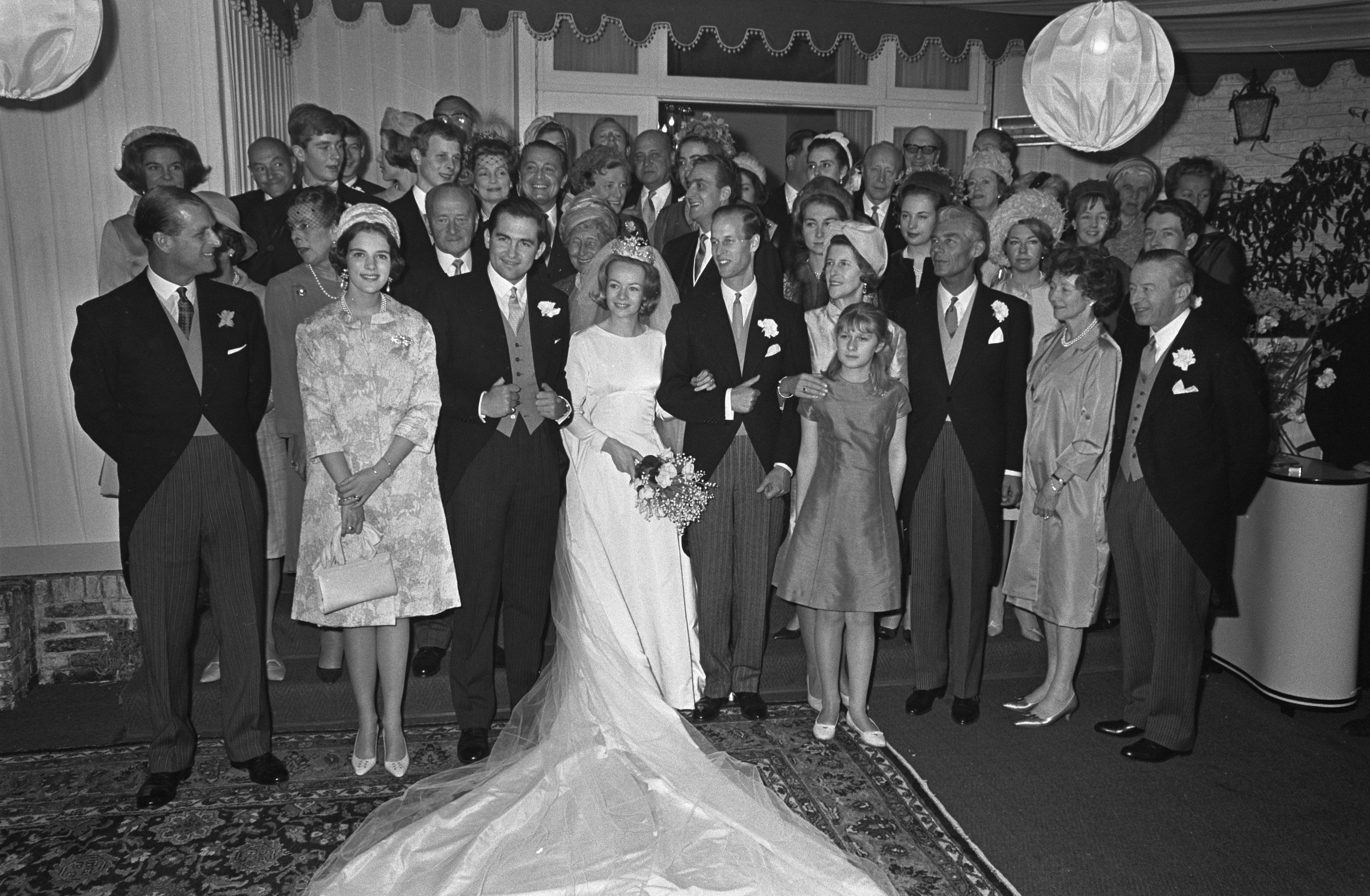
The wedding of Prince Karl and Countess Yvonne Szapáry (1966). Some royal attendants in the photo include: The Duke of Edinburgh; Princess Irene of Greece; Queen Anne-Marie; King Constantine II of Greece; Princess Victoria Louise of Prussia; Prince Juan Carlos of Spain (the future King Juan Carlos I); Princess Sofia

In 1966, Karl married his distant relative, Countess Yvonne Szapáry von Muraszombath (b. 1944), the only daughter of Count Béla Szapáry (1901-1993) and his wife, Baroness Ursula von Richthofen (1907-2002). Two children were born from this marriage:

- Christopher of Hesse-Kassel (1969), prince of Hesse-Kassel, single;
- Irina Verena of Hesse-Kassel (1971), princess of Hesse-Cassel, who married, in 1999, Alexander, Count of Schönburg-Glauchau (1969), the Head of the House of Schönburg-Glauchau. The couple had three children:
  - Countess Maria-Letitia Jolanta of Schönburg-Glauchau (b. 30 July 2001)
  - Count Maximus Carolus Joachim Maria of Schönburg-Glauchau (b. 25 May 2003)
  - Count Valentin Polykarp Josef Maria of Schönburg-Glauchau (b. 23 February 2005)

While he was established in Munich with his wife, Karl was known for his interest in oriental philosophies and alternative medicines.

Karl briefly discussed his mother's childhood and her ties to the Nazi regime in a documentary in 2015 about his uncle, Prince Philip: The Plot to Make a King (2015).

== Death ==
Prince Karl of Hesse died in Munich, at the age of 84 years, on March 23, 2022. His body is interred in Panker, Schleswig-Holstein, Germany.

== Ancestry ==
Ancestors of Prince Karl of Hesse

8. Prince Frederick William of Hesse-Kassel
4. Prince Frederick Charles of Hesse
9. Princess Anna of Prussia
2. Prince Christoph of Hesse
10. Frederick III, German Emperor
5. Princess Margaret of Prussia
11. Victoria, Princess Royal
1. Prince Karl of Hesse
12. George I of Greece
6. Prince Andrew of Greece and Denmark
13. Grand Duchess Olga Constantinovna of Russia
3. Princess Sophie of Greece and Denmark
14. Prince Louis of Battenberg
7. Princess Alice of Battenberg
15. Princess Victoria of Hesse and by Rhine
