= Princess Christina of Hesse =

German princess (1933–2011)

Princess Christina
- Princess Andrew of Yugoslavia
- Christina in 1956
- Born: 10 January 1933; Kronberg im Taunus, Weimar Republic
- Died: 22 November 2011 (aged 78); Gersau, Switzerland
- Spouse: Prince Andrew of Yugoslavia (m. 1956; div. 1962) Robert Floris van Eyck (m. 1962; div. 1986)
- Issue: Princess Maria Tatiana of Yugoslavia; Prince Christopher of Yugoslavia; Sophie van Eyck; Mark van Eyck
Names
- Christina Margarethe
- House: Hesse-Kassel (by birth); Karađorđević (by marriage)
- Father: Prince Christoph of Hesse
- Mother: Princess Sophie of Greece and Denmark

Princess Christina Margarethe of Hesse (German: Christina Margarethe Prinzessin von Hessen; 10 January 1933 – 22 November 2011) was a German princess. A first cousin of King Charles III of the United Kingdom, she was the wife, from 1956 to 1962, of Prince Andrew of Yugoslavia, a son of Alexander I of Yugoslavia.

== Family background and early life ==
Born in Germany on 10 January 1933 at Friedrichshof Castle near Kronberg im Taunus, Princess Christina ("Krista") of Hesse was the eldest child of Prince Christoph of Hesse (1901–1943) and Princess Sophie of Greece and Denmark (1914–2001) Her father, Prince Christoph of Hesse, was a nephew of Germany's last emperor Wilhelm II. Her mother, Princess Sophie of Greece and Denmark, was a grand-daughter of King George I of Greece and a sister of Prince Philip, Duke of Edinburgh. Christina belonged by birth to the senior line of the House of Hesse, a junior branch of which reigned as grand dukes of Hesse and by Rhine within the German Empire until 1918. Christina's paternal grandmother, Princess Margaret of Prussia, was a daughter of Queen Victoria's eldest daughter Victoria, and as such a sister of Kaiser Wilhelm II.

Prince Christoph, a member of the Schutzstaffel (SS), held important positions in Germany's Nazi regime. During World War II, he was a major in the Luftwaffe. On 7 October 1943, when Christina was ten years old, her father was killed in an airplane crash in the Apennine Mountains near Forlì, Italy. His widow married Prince George William of Hanover in 1946.

From her mother's two marriages, Christina had four siblings and three half-siblings: Princess Dorothea of Hesse (1934–2025), Prince Karl of Hesse (1937–2022), Prince Rainer of Hesse (born 1939), Princess Clarissa of Hesse (born 1944), Prince Welf of Hanover (1947–1981), Prince Georg of Hanover (born 1949) and Princess Friederike of Hanover (born 1954).

Her childhood homes included her paternal grandmother's palace of Friedrichshof in Taunus, a family castle at Panker in Holstein, and her parents' residence in Berlin-Dahlem.

Christina participated in the 1953 coronation of her aunt at Westminster Abbey, walking in the procession led by her maternal grandmother, Princess Alice. Christina and her cousin Princess Beatrix of Hohenlohe-Langenburg spent the winter of 1955-1956 living in London, where Christina studied the restoration of paintings under Anthony Blunt. It was reported that the princesses' closest friend in England was Prince Andrew of Yugoslavia. They had met him the previous year in Portugal, and he thought they were lonely in London.

== First marriage ==
Princess Christina of Hesse married Prince Andrew of Yugoslavia, the youngest son of Alexander I of Yugoslavia and Princess Maria of Romania, on 2 August 1956, at Friedrichshof Castle. They had two children:

- Princess Maria Tatiana ("Tania") of Yugoslavia (born 18 July 1957), lived for a while at Buckingham Palace prior to her marriage to Gregory Thune-Larsen on 30 June 1990, has practised professional photography, and has issue.
- Prince Christopher of Yugoslavia (4 February 1960 – 14 May 1994), lived first with his father and stepmother in Portugal until their divorce in 1972, whereupon he returned to England to live with his mother and stepfather. He was deployed in Belize and Northern Ireland after enlisting in the British army, becoming a sergeant in the Royal Electrical and Mechanical Engineers until 1988. He studied optic electronics, obtained a degree in laser engineering at Heriot-Watt University and trained at Craigie College in Ayr before teaching high school science at Bowmore on the Isle of Islay in Scotland under the name "Chris George". He was accidentally killed while bicycling home from Port Ellen in May 1994, news of which tragedy his godfather, the Duke of Edinburgh, broke to Christopher's grandmother, Princess Sophie of Hanover, then a guest at Windsor Castle while visiting from Germany.

Soon after their marriage, Princess Christina and her first husband had purchased The Hollands, a commercial farm at Langton Green in Kent, England, which did not prove a profitable venture. Moving to London, Prince Andrew supported his family by working for an import/export business and, later, as a bank executive.

In 1961 Christina left her husband to live with an abstract artist from the Netherlands, Robert Floris van Eyck. Andrew initiated a divorce, and obtained custody of the couple's two children when dissolution of the marriage became final on 31 May 1962.

== Second marriage ==
Following her divorce, Christina married Robert van Eyck on 3 December 1962 in London. Of Sephardic extraction, Robert van Eyck was the son of poet, critic, essayist and philosopher Pieter Nicolaas van Eyck, and the brother of architect Aldo van Eyck. The couple had two children, Helen Sophia van Eyck (born 1963) and Mark Nicholas van Eyck (born 1966). Her first husband Prince Andrew also married for the second time, this time to another cousin, Princess Kira Melita zu Leiningen (1930–2006).

Christina and Robert van Eyck separated in 1985, and divorced 3 February 1986.

In addition to Germany and England, Princess Christina of Hesse had lived in Saint-Paul-de-Vence, France, and in Gersau, Switzerland.

== Ancestry ==
Ancestors of Princess Christina of Hesse

8. Prince Frederick William of Hesse-Kassel
4. Prince Frederick Charles of Hesse
9. Princess Anna of Prussia
2. Prince Christoph of Hesse
10. Frederick III, German Emperor
5. Princess Margaret of Prussia
11. Victoria, Princess Royal
1. Princess Christina of Hesse
12. George I of Greece
6. Prince Andrew of Greece and Denmark
13. Grand Duchess Olga Constantinovna of Russia
3. Princess Sophie of Greece and Denmark
14. Prince Louis of Battenberg
7. Princess Alice of Battenberg
15. Princess Victoria of Hesse and by Rhine
