= Anđelović =

Origin
- Language: Serbo-Croatian

Anđelović (also spelled Andjelović) is a Serbian surname, which may refer to:

- Anđelović noble family, a branch of the Byzantine Angeloi
  - Mihailo Anđelović
  - Mahmud Pasha Anđelović
- Branislav Anđelović, guitarist in Rokeri s Moravu

== See also ==
- Anđelić
- Anđelković
- Aranđelović
