= Prince Christoph of Hesse =

German noble and officer (1901–1943)

Prince Christoph
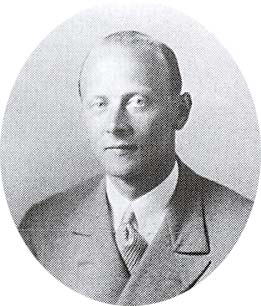
- Christoph in 1930
- Born: 14 May 1901; Frankfurt, German Empire
- Died: 7 October 1943 (aged 42); Forlì, Italian Social Republic
- Spouse: Princess Sophie of Greece and Denmark (m. 1930)
- Issue: Princess Christina; Princess Dorothea; Prince Karl Adolf; Prince Rainer; Princess Clarissa
- House: Hesse-Kassel
- Father: Prince Frederick Charles of Hesse
- Mother: Princess Margaret of Prussia
- Military career
- Allegiance: Nazi Germany
- Branch: Luftwaffe
- Rank: Major in the Reserve

Prince Christoph of Hesse (Christoph Ernst August; 14 May 1901 – 7 October 1943) was a nephew of Kaiser Wilhelm II. He was an SS-Oberführer in the Allgemeine SS and an officer in the Luftwaffe Reserve, killed on active duty in a plane crash during World War II. His brother-in-law Prince Philip of Greece and Denmark fought on the British side and married the future Queen Elizabeth II after the war.

== Birth ==
Prince Christoph of Hesse was born in Frankfurt, the fifth son of Prince Frederick Charles of Hesse and Princess Margaret of Prussia. He was a twin, with Prince Richard of Hesse. His father, Frederick Charles, a scion of the House of Hesse, was elected King of Finland in 1918, when Finland declared its independence after the collapse of the Russian Empire. However, the overwhelming Republican victories in the 1919 Finnish parliamentary election effectively ended any ambitions for a Finnish monarchy.

Christoph's mother was the daughter of Emperor Frederick III and of Victoria, Princess Royal. Prince Christoph was thus a great-grandson of Queen Victoria and Prince Albert of Saxe-Coburg and Gotha. Christoph had several brothers, including Prince Philipp and Prince Wolfgang. His two eldest brothers, Friedrich Wilhelm and Maximilian, both died in World War I.

== Career and death ==
Prince Christoph was a director in the Third Reich's Ministry of Air Forces, Commander of the Air Reserves, and held the rank of Oberführer in the SS. His brother Prince Philipp joined Hitler's SA. They were not the only family members to embrace Nazism; their mother "Mossy" (a sister of Kaiser Wilhelm II) invited Adolf Hitler to tea and flew the swastika from her home at Schloss Kronberg.

According to the historian Hugo Vickers, Prince Christoph became "disenchanted" with the Nazi Party by the time of the assassination of Reinhard Heydrich in 1942. He told his mother: "The death of a certain dangerous and cruel man is the best news I had in a long time."

Prince Christoph served in the Luftwaffe Research Office and, in 1942, he joined the staff of a fighter unit, Jagdgeschwader 53. He was based primarily in Tunisia and Sicily, with missions to Malta.

After the Allied Invasion of Italy, Christoph was recalled to Germany, but was killed during his return. On 7 October 1943, his plane, a Siebel 104, collided with a hill in the Apennine Mountains 30 km southwest of Forlì, Italy. His body and the body of his copilot Wilhelm Gsteu were found two days later and were buried in a German military cemetery near Forlì. In 1953, the coffin was transferred to Kronberg im Taunus.

== Family ==
Christoph married his second cousin, once removed, Princess Sophie of Greece and Denmark on 15 December 1930 in Kronberg im Taunus, Germany. Princess Sophie was the youngest daughter of Prince Andrew of Greece and Denmark and Princess Alice of Battenberg, and the sister of the future Prince Philip, Duke of Edinburgh.

The couple had five children:

- Princess Christina Margarethe of Hesse (10 January 1933 – 22 November 2011), married Prince Andrew of Yugoslavia (1929–1990) on 2 August 1956 and divorced in London in 1962. They had two children and two granddaughters. She remarried Robert Floris van Eyck (1916–1991) on 3 December 1962 and had two further children and two granddaughters.
- Princess Dorothea Charlotte Karin of Hesse (24 July 1934 – 24 August 2025) married Prince Friedrich Karl zu Windisch-Grätz (7 July 1917 – 29 May 2002) on 31 March 1959 and had two daughters, six grandchildren and two great-grandchildren.
- Prince Karl Adolf Andreas of Hesse (26 March 1937 – 23 March 2022) married Countess Yvonne Margit Valerie Szapáry von Muraszombath, Széchysziget und Szapár (born 4 April 1944 in Budapest) on 26 March 1966 and had two children.
- Prince Rainer Christoph Friedrich of Hesse (born 18 November 1939), unmarried and without issue.
- Princess Clarissa Alice of Hesse (born 6 February 1944) married Jean-Claude Derrien (born 12 March 1948) on 20 July 1971 and was divorced in 1976. She has a daughter.

Some years after Christoph's death, his widow married Prince George William of Hanover, a brother of Queen Fredrica of Greece and a grandson of Kaiser Wilhelm II. She had a further three children.

Four years after Christoph's death, his widow's brother, Philip, married the future Queen Elizabeth II. Christoph's surviving children are first cousins of King Charles III.

== Ancestry ==
Ancestors of Prince Christoph of Hesse

8. Prince William of Hesse-Kassel
4. Prince Frederick William of Hesse-Kassel
9. Princess Louise Charlotte of Denmark
2. Prince Frederick Charles of Hesse
10. Prince Charles of Prussia
5. Princess Anna of Prussia
11. Princess Marie of Saxe-Weimar-Eisenach
1. Prince Christoph of Hesse
12. William I, German Emperor
6. Frederick III, German Emperor
13. Princess Augusta of Saxe-Weimar-Eisenach
3. Princess Margaret of Prussia
14. Prince Albert of Saxe-Coburg and Gotha
7. Victoria, Princess Royal
15. Victoria of the United Kingdom
