= Aranđelović =

Origin
- Language: Serbo-Croatian
- Meaning: Aranđel, meaning "Archangel".
- Region of origin: Balkans

Other names
- Variant form: see also

Aranđelović (Serbian Cyrillic: Аранђеловић; also spelled Arandjelovic) is a Serbian surname, derived from the male given name and word Aranđel, meaning "Archangel". It may refer to:

- Stole Aranđelović
- Aleksandar Aranđelović
- Ljiljana Aranđelović
- Luka Aranđelović (Singer of Lavina)
- Pavle Aranđelović (Keyboardist of Lavina)

== See also ==
- Arhanđelović, surname
- Aranđić, surname
- Anđelović, surname
