= Maria of Yugoslavia =

Queen of Yugoslavia from 1922 to 1934

Maria
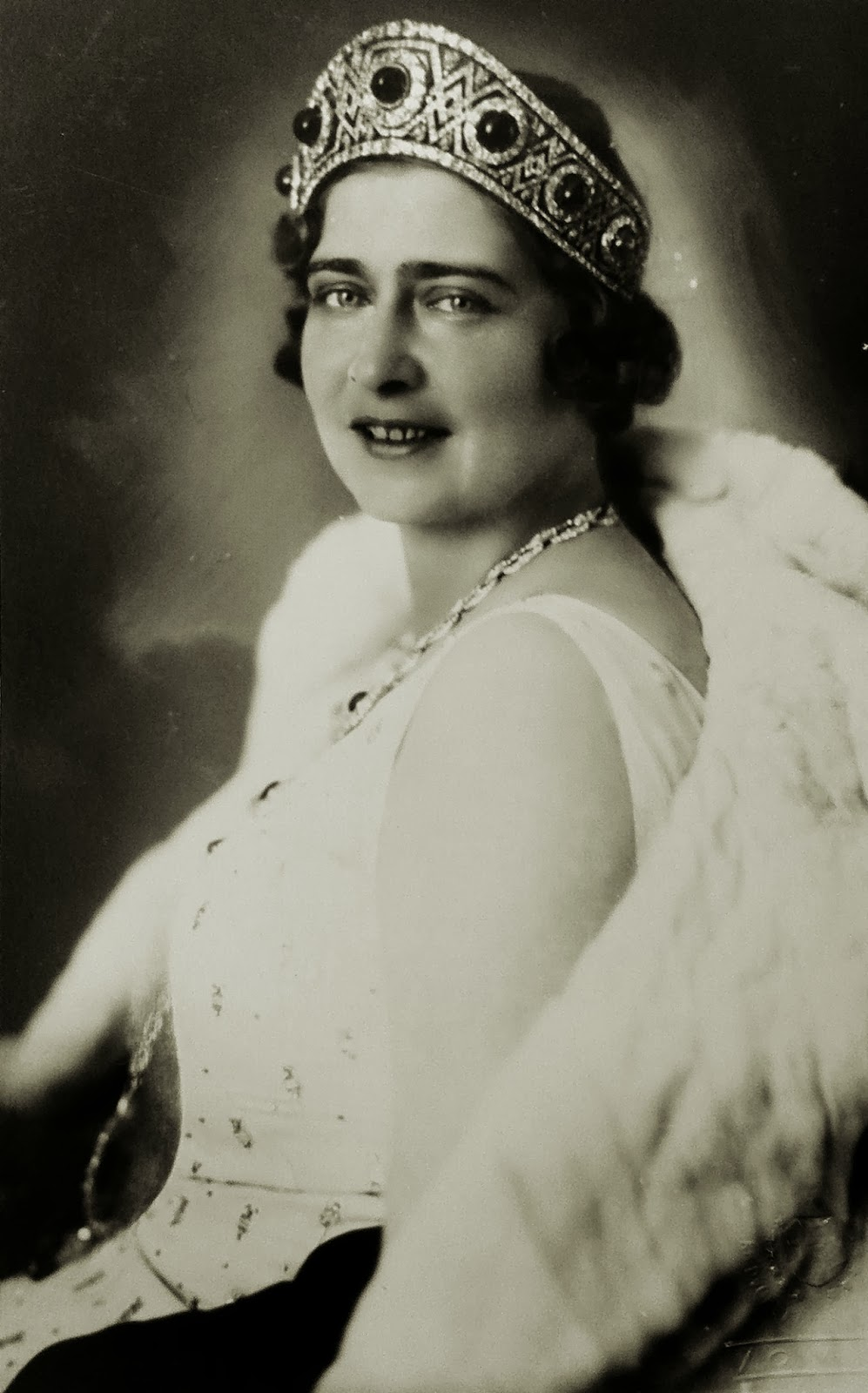
- Queen Maria in 1931

Queen consort of Yugoslavia (Note: As Queen consort of the Serbs, Croats and Slovenes until 3 October 1929)
- Tenure: 3 June 1922 – 9 October 1934
- Born: 6 January 1900; Friedenstein Palace, Gotha, Duchy of Saxe-Coburg and Gotha, German Empire
- Died: 22 June 1961 (aged 61); Chelsea, London, England
- Burial: Royal Burial Ground, Frogmore, Windsor (1961–2013); Royal Mausoleum Oplenac, Serbia (since 2013)
- Spouse: Alexander I of Yugoslavia (m. 1922; died 1934)
- Issue: Peter II of Yugoslavia; Prince Tomislav; Prince Andrew
- House: Hohenzollern-Sigmaringen (by birth); Karađorđević (by marriage)
- Father: Ferdinand I of Romania
- Mother: Marie of Edinburgh

Maria (born Princess Maria of Romania; known in Serbian as Marija Karađorđević (Note: Serbian Cyrillic: Марија Карађорђевић); 6 January 1900 – 22 June 1961), was Queen of the Serbs, Croats and Slovenes from 1922 to 1929 and Queen of Yugoslavia from 1929 to 1934 as the wife of King Alexander I. She was the mother of King Peter II. Her citizenship was revoked, and her property was confiscated by the Yugoslav communist regime in 1947, but she was posthumously rehabilitated in 2014.

== Early life ==
Maria was born on 6 January 1900, at Friedenstein Palace in Gotha, a town in Thuringia, in the German Empire. She was named after her maternal grandmother, Grand Duchess Maria Alexandrovna of Russia, and was known as Mignon in the family to distinguish her from her mother. Her parents were Prince Ferdinand of Hohenzollern-Sigmaringen (later Ferdinand I of Romania) and Princess Marie of Edinburgh (later Queen Maria). In her memoirs, Queen Marie of Romania wrote of her third child:

she was from her first day a child of joy and sunshine, for these miracles do come to pass. Smiling and astonishingly loving from her tenderest infancy, she was more than a consolation, she was a revelation, and I loved her with a love difficult to describe; I could not let her out of my sight, she was a message of peace and hope. We christened her Marie after my mother and her mother before her, but we called her Mignon and this name has stuck to her for ever. To us all she is and always will be Mignon

In 1914, after the death of King Carol I, her parents became King and Queen of Romania, and Maria moved with them to Romania, which became her new home country. During World War I, she worked as a nurse with her mother, along with her two sisters. Although 'plump', Maria was a noted beauty in her youth and resembled her elder sister, Elisabeth.

The family spent their holidays at Peleș Castle near Sinaia. In 1922, King Alexander I of Yugoslavia was invited to Peleș Castle, and introduced to Maria. Maria and Alexander fell in love, and were engaged with the support of Maria's father Ferdinand I.

== Queen Consort ==
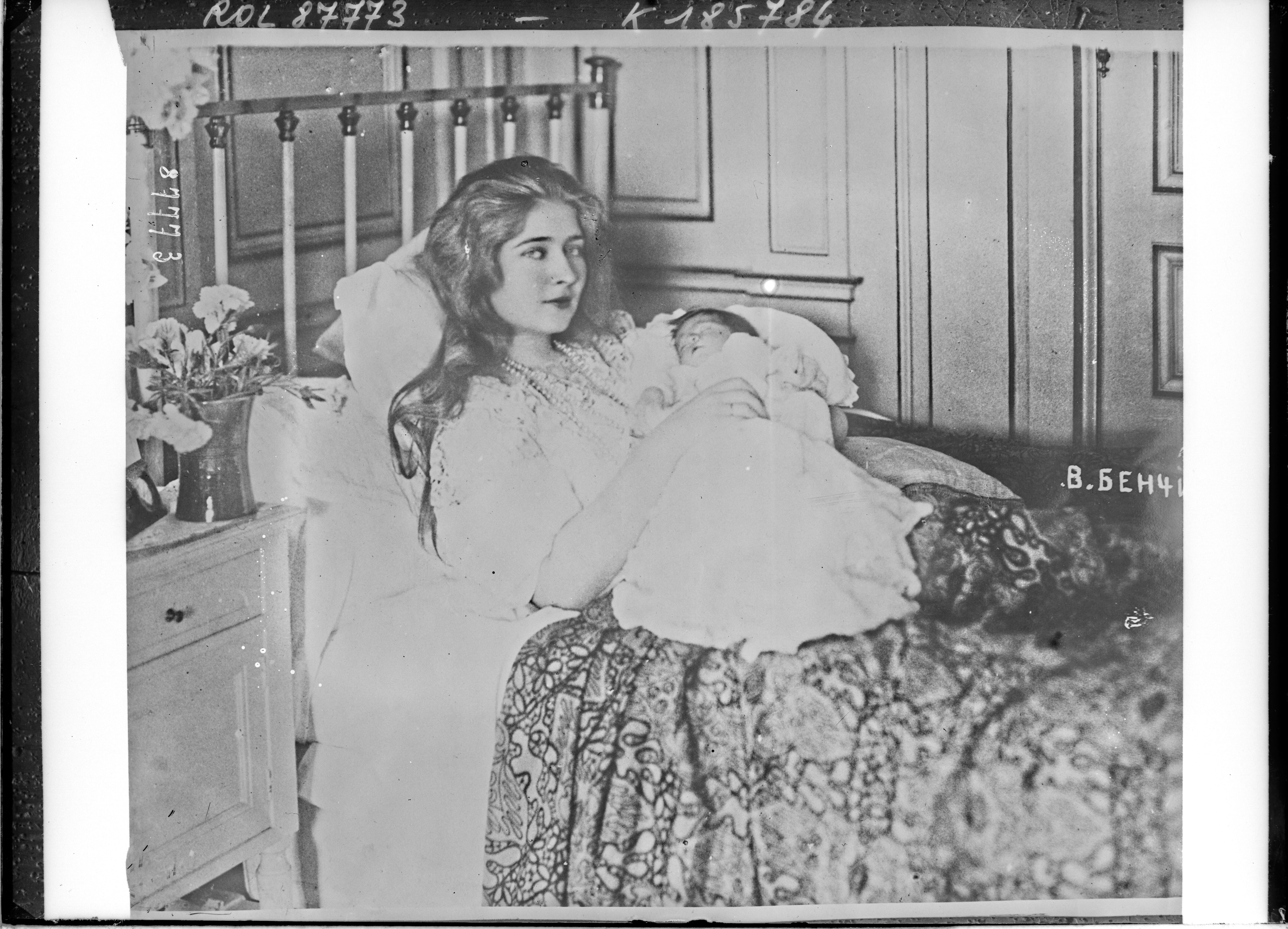
The queen of Yugoslavia with her newborn son, Peter.

Maria married Alexander I, second King of Serbs, Croats and Slovenes, in Belgrade on 8 June 1922. The wedding took place at the Saint Michael's cathedral. The wedding was given big international publicity at the time. Since Maria was related to the British royal family, the British Crown was represented by the Duke of York, who attended the wedding as witness.

On 3 October 1929, Maria became Queen of Yugoslavia when Alexander changed the name of the country. The royal couple settled at the Karađorđević estate in Oplenac near Topola. Since the new Royal Residence in Belgrade was not finished, the king and queen continued to live at the Karađorđević estate. Queen Maria established good relations with the Orthodox clergy and engaged in charity. At the Karađorđević estate, Maria participated in the work of the local peasantry at the royal estate, and could be seen working in the field dressed in traditional folk costume. She founded schools for the children of the local farmers, scholarships for the benefit of poor students and cooperated with the church to help poor families. Her first son was given a traditional royal Serbian name, her second son was given a Croatian name and her third son was given a Slovenian name to create unity in the new state of Yugoslavia. Her sons played with the children of the workers on the estate. The simple life of Maria gave her a great deal of favourable publicity, and her popularity also benefitted Alexander, when she and sometimes the sons accompanied him on his trips around Yugoslavia.

Maria was well educated. She spoke several languages fluently and enjoyed painting and sculpting under the guidance of artist Iva Despić-Simonović. She also drove a car by herself, which was very unusual for royalty at the time.

Following the assassination of her husband, King Alexander I, in Marseille in 1934, her oldest son, aged only 11, became Peter II of Yugoslavia and was the last reigning Yugoslav king. Her son, being a minor, was placed under the regency of his father’s cousin, Prince Paul. The regent gave Maria an allowance of six million dinars for herself and her sons; she kept a quarter of that amount, and donated the rest to charity. Queen Maria initially kept participating in royal representation as a widow. Her first assignment as a widow was a campaign against tuberculosis.

After the death of Alexander, Maria suffered from a deteriorating state of rheumatism. In 1938, she bought a farm in Gransden in Bedfordshire north of London in England. In 1939, she moved permanently to her house in England: she took her younger sons with her, but was obliged to leave her eldest son in Yugoslavia because of his position as monarch. It was rumoured at the time that Maria left Yugoslavia because of a conflict with the Prince Regent Paul, but the official reason stated for her move was her health. She was given the title Queen Mother of Yugoslavia in 1941.

== Later life ==
Yugoslavia declared itself neutral at the outbreak of World War II. On 25 March 1941, however, Prince Paul declared Yugoslavia an ally of Nazi Germany and Fascist Italy. On 27 March, Peter II deposed Prince Paul as regent. On 6 April, Nazi Germany attacked Yugoslavia, and Peter II fled to Britain, arriving in June. Maria suggested that she should return to Yugoslavia to stand by the Yugoslav people during the war, but was prevented by her health problems from doing so.

During the war, Maria provided relief help for Yugoslav prisoners of war in Nazi custody through the Red Cross in Britain. To avoid being identified by the Germans as a sender, she gave the name of Mary Djordjevic as the sender of the packages, but she was identified by the Yugoslav prisoners.

On 29 November 1945, the monarchy was abolished in Yugoslavia. Her son, Peter II, settled in the United States. Maria herself bought a new farm in Kent, where she lived a simple life with her two younger sons, often seen working in the fields. She chose not to use her contacts as a relative of the British royal family. She engaged in the Yugoslav community in London, as well as her interest in art, and studied at the Byam Shaw School of Art and participated in several exhibitions with her art work.

She died at her home in exile in Chelsea, London on 22 June 1961, aged 61.Her funeral was held on 2 July 1961 at the Serbian Orthodox Church, Notting Hill, London and was initially interred at the Royal Burial Ground at Frogmore, which adjoins Windsor Castle. Her remains were transferred to Serbia in April 2013 and reinterred on 26 May 2013 in Oplenac, Serbia.

== Family ==
Maria and Alexander I had three sons:

- King Peter II (6 September 1923 – 3 November 1970) ∞ Princess Alexandra of Greece and Denmark (1921-1993)
- Prince Tomislav (19 January 1928 – 12 July 2000) ∞ Princess Margarita of Baden (1932-2013) ∞ Linda Mary Bonney (1949-)
- Prince Andrew (28 June 1929 – 7 May 1990) ∞ Princess Christina Margarethe of Hesse (1933-2011) ∞ Princess Kira Melita of Leiningen (1930-2005) ∞ Eva Maria Andjelkovic (1926-2020)

== Honours ==
- Kingdom of Romania: Dame Grand Cross of the Order of Carol I
- Kingdom of Romania: Dame Grand Cross of the Order of the Crown of Romania
- Kingdom of Yugoslavia: Dame Grand Cross of the Order of the Star of Karađorđe (8 June 1922)
- Kingdom of Yugoslavia: Dame Grand Cross of the Order of the Yugoslav Crown (5 April 1930)
- Kingdom of Bulgaria: Dame Grand Cross of the Order of St. Alexander, in Diamonds (1934)
- Czechoslovakia: Grand Cross of the Order of the White Lion (4 April 1937)
- France: Dame Grand Cross of the Legion of Honour (1959)

== Gallery ==
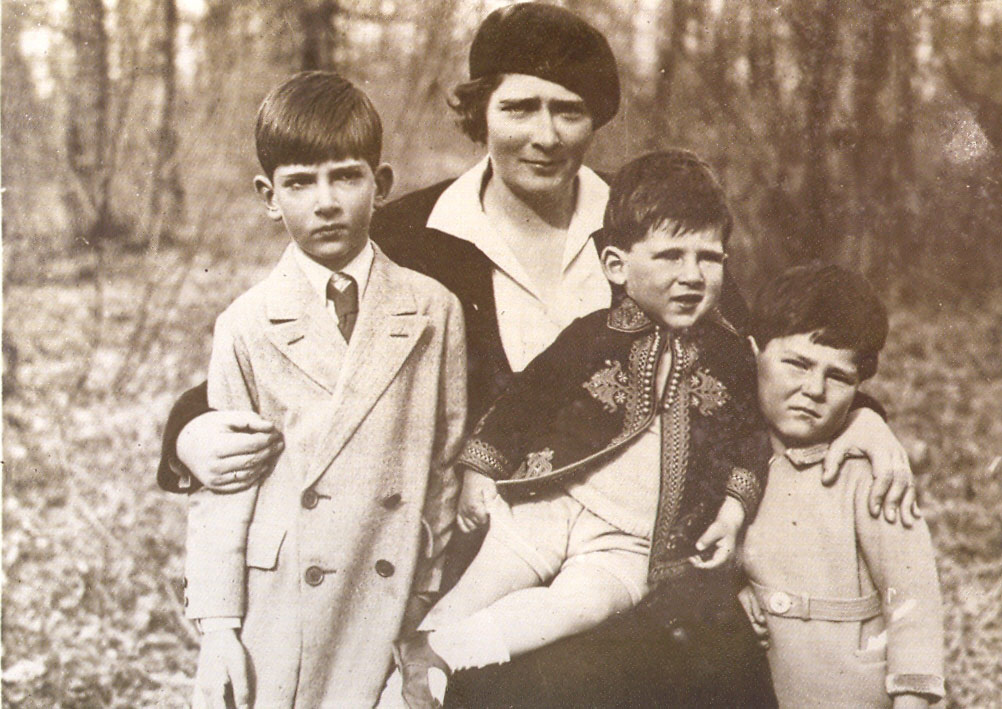
Maria with her sons, Peter, Tomislav, and Andrej

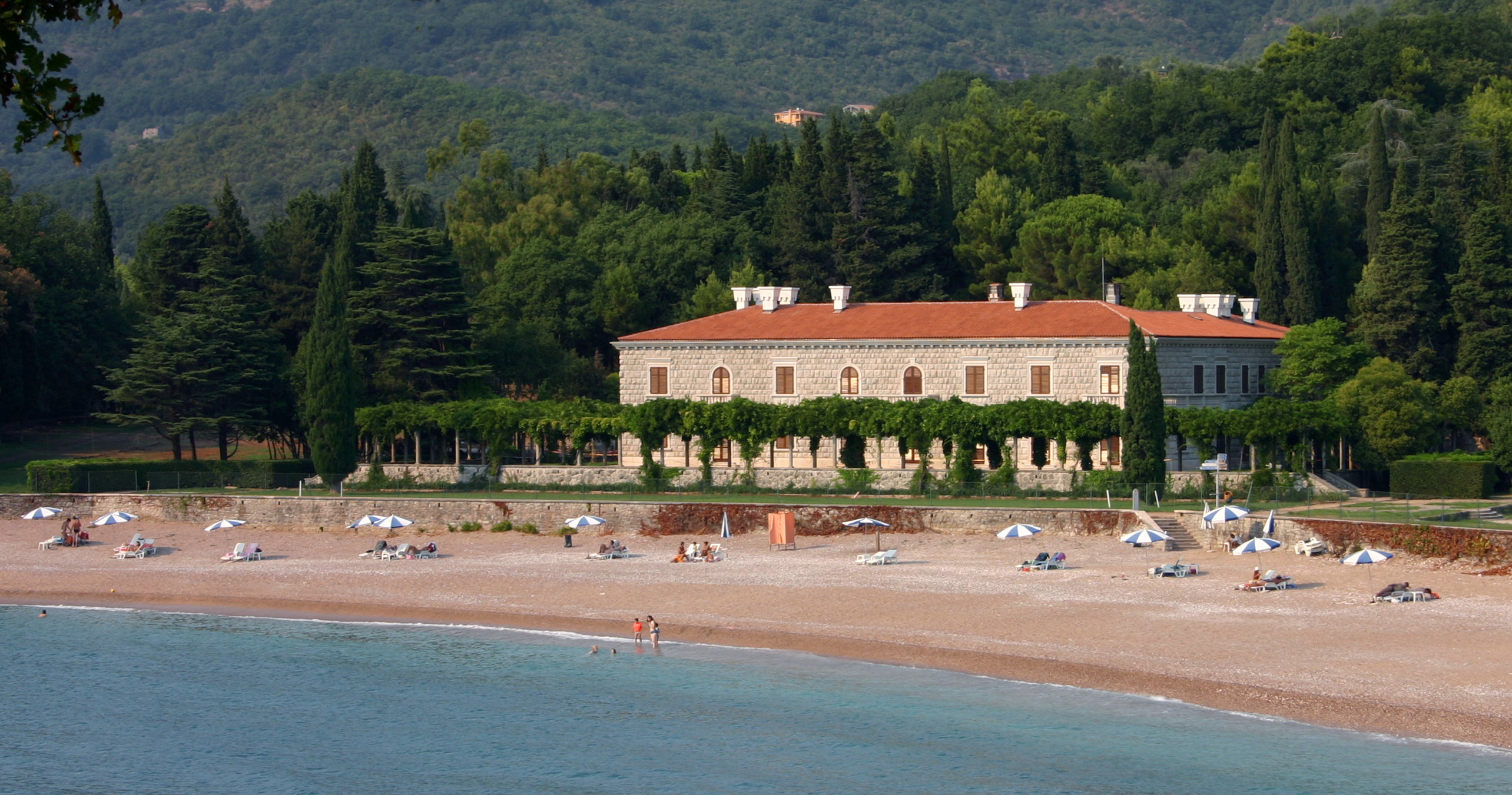
Queen's summer residence near Budva, Montenegro.

== Notes ==
Maria of Yugoslavia House of Hohenzollern-Sigmaringen Cadet branch of the House of Hohenzollern Born: 6 January 1900 Died: 22 June 1961
Yugoslavian royalty
Vacant Title last held by Draga Obrenović as Queen consort of Serbia	Queen consort of Serbs, Croats, and Slovenes later of Yugoslavia; 8 June 1922 – 9 October 1934	Vacant Title next held by Princess Alexandra of Greece and Denmark
