= Pieter Nicolaas van Eyck =

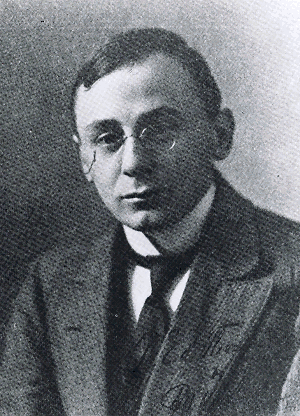
P.N. van Eyck (1914)

Pieter Nicolaas/Nicolaus van Eyck (Breukelen, 1 October 1887 – Wassenaar, 28 April 1954), poet, critic, essayist and philosopher.

== Early life ==
He was born Pieter Nicolaas van Eijk and changed his name to van Eyck around 1907. He worked as a foreign correspondent for the Dutch newspaper NRC in Rome and London, but also a poet, critic, essayist and philosopher from the Netherlands. Awarded the Constantijn Huygens Prize in 1947.

== Education ==
Van Eyck attended Gymnasium Haganum before studying law.

After Albert Verwey resigned from the university of Leiden in 1935, van Eyck took on the professorship for Dutch language and literature there, a position which he held until his death. He was elected a member of the Royal Netherlands Academy of Arts and Sciences in 1946.

== Family ==
He married on 28 April 1914 Nelly Estelle Benjamins (Suriname, 17 August 1891 - Wassenaar, South Holland, 1971), a woman of Sephardic origin born and raised in Suriname. They moved to Great Britain in 1919.

They were the parents of:

- Robert Floris van Eyck or van Eijk, a London poet, artist and art restorer, husband of Princess Christina of Hesse
- Aldo van Eyck or van Eijk, architect

== Works ==
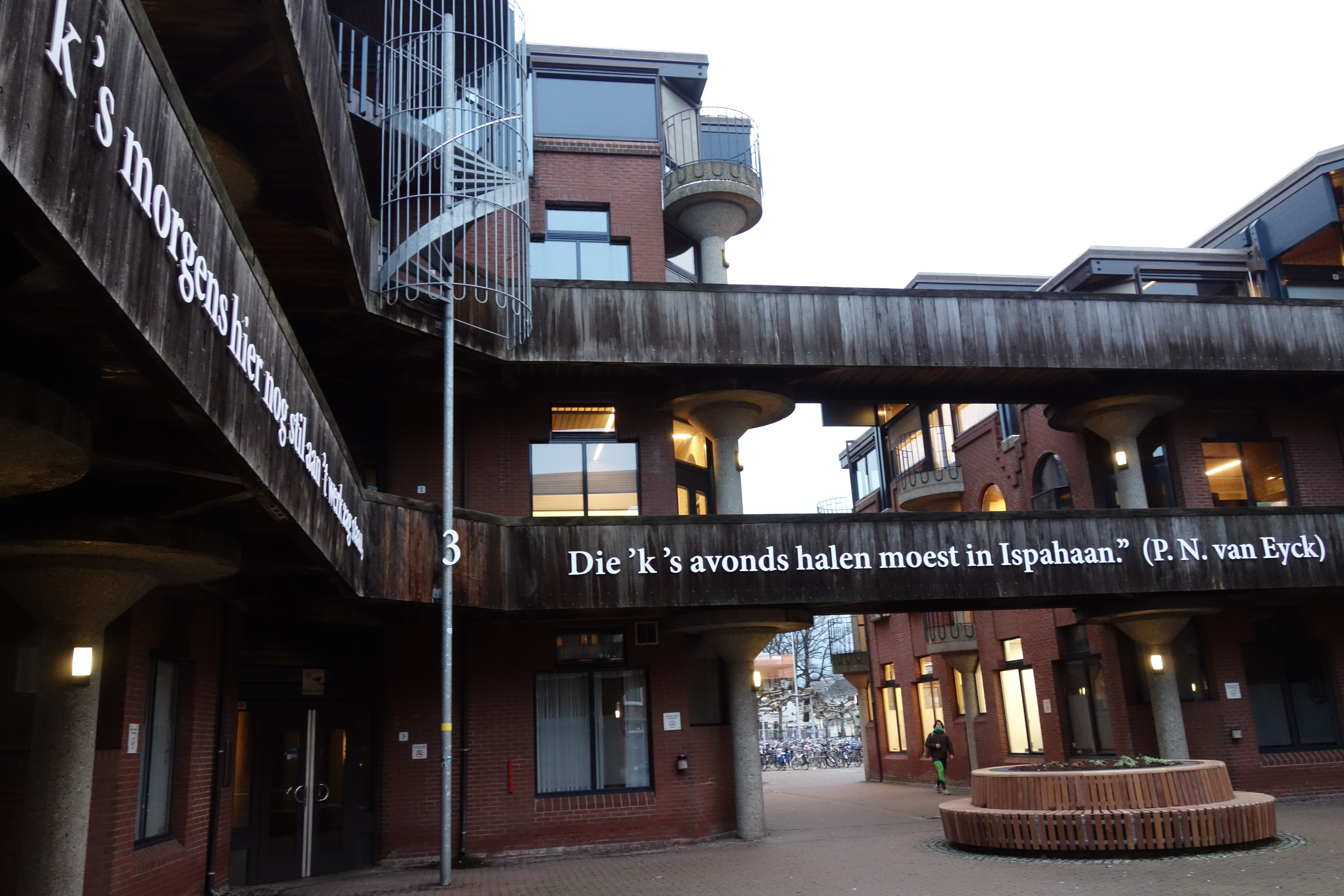
Quotation from Death and the Gardener (P.N. van Eyckhof, Leiden)

His most famous poem "Death and the Gardener" (1926) is a theme taken from Jean Cocteau’s novel "Le grand écart". In his turn, Cocteau took the story from Rumi. Another version is in the Babylonian Talmud. The Van Eyck poem was translated in English by David Colmer in 2007. Colmer's translation received the David Reid Poetry Translation Prize and was printed by the Bucheliuspers in Utrecht.

== See also ==
- Van Eyck
