= Anđelković =

- Language: Serbo-Croatian

Origin
- Meaning: patronymic of Anđelko

Anđelković (Serbian Cyrillic: Анђелковић) is a Serbian surname, a patronymic derived from Anđelko. It may refer to:

- Dušan Anđelković
- Koča Anđelković
- Marko Anđelković
- Milivoje Anđelković
- Miodrag Anđelković
- Siniša Anđelković
- Slobodan Anđelković

== See also ==
- Anđelović
