= Branislav Andjelić =

Serbian internet pioneer

Branislav Andjelić (Serbian Cyrillic: Бранислав Анђелић; born 1959) is a Serbian Internet pioneer, economist and politician. He established the first Serbian Internet portal, the first Serbian e-commerce site and the first Serbian Internet news service. As a close associate of then Serbian Prime-Minister Zoran Đinđić, he established and managed the first Serbian government agency in charge of the Internet.

== Biography ==
=== Background and early career ===
Branislav Andjelić was born in Belgrade, Serbia (then Yugoslavia). His father died when he was seven and he and his younger sister Jasmina were raised by their mother. To help out with the family finances, he started working as a photographer's assistant while still in the eighth grade. By the eleventh grade Branislav had a thriving wedding photography business with his friend Milovan Mišić. He volunteered teaching younger children photography at the local community center and received Nikola Tesla Award for his efforts.

In 1977 he received one of the two scholarships awarded annually by the Yugoslav Government and American Field Service to complete his senior year in the United States, where he graduated from the University Lake School in 1978.

Andjelic returned to Belgrade to study journalism at the University of Belgrade, but after completing three years with honors left for financial reasons. He worked as a procurement officer for the World Bank/IMF in Belgrade, translator on the military chemical complex in Iraq, commercial manager for the construction company in Kenya, site manager for a port project in Libya and marketing manager for the electrical contractor in Belgrade.

During all this time Branislav worked as a journalist in parallel. In 1986 he won an award with his senior colleague Dragan Milosavljević for a TV documentary about the atrocities committed by the Okello government in the Uganda's Luwero triangle.

=== Moving abroad ===
In 1987 Andjelic was posted by a Serbian magazine to Washington, D.C. He decided to go back to school in parallel and in 1991 he graduated in economics from the University of the District of Columbia. He was an early adopter of the Internet technology, having the dial-up account since 1990 with the Software Tool and Die Company, the first Internet service provider in the world.

In 1991 Andjelić moved to Boston to join his friend Miroslav Radić in an IT startup company. The company provided early web design, as well as satellite connectivity in the remote parts of the world. Combining his economics and IT expertise Branislav also consulted in business process reengineering and technology introduction in medium-sized companies in the area.

=== beograd.com ===
In 1995 Andjelić moved to Toronto where he established a startup Internet company. During that time Internet was cut off to Serbia, and Branislav and his friend from Belgrade Nenad Ćosić devised a way to allow Serbian entities to have an Internet presence by uploading content through the plain old telephone lines to the site beograd.com hosted in Canada. The first clients were Yugoslav Drama Theatre, Megatrend School, Belgrade Library and Democratic Party, but the list quickly grew. In 1996 when the access to Internet was again possible in Serbia, beograd.com hosted the first censorship-free forum for the Serbian opposition and a mirror site for the student protest then held against Milošević government in Belgrade.

During the food and essentials shortage in Serbia in 1997, as no money transfers were possible, Andjelić and Ćosić established a fully automated e-shop on beograd.com through which Serbian expatriates could purchase goods using credit cards for delivery to their friends and relatives in Serbia. The services later added included airline ticketing, a bookshop and medical services in Serbia.

When NATO attacked Serbia in 1999, Andjelić and Ćosić organized a news service on beograd.com which reported live through hundreds of stringers in the field. Spotters in NATO bases in Europe reported when planes took off, so readers of the site had extra time to prepare for the attack. Stringers in the field all over Serbia reported damage before any other news outlet, often as it happened, which were often quoted by CNN and BBC. AP and Reuters wrote features about the site and hundreds of newspapers around the world picked it up. In May 1999 site reached 9 million hits per day, prompting shut-down due to the enormous bandwidth charges. Within a week readers from all over the world sent money and offered mirrors, and the site was back up. In 2000 beograd.com became the first electronic media to be accepted in the South East Europe Media Organisation in Vienna and Andjelić became a member of the International Press Institute.

After Andjelić returned to Serbia in 2000 beograd.com ceased active operation.

=== Return to Serbia ===
Andjelić returned to Serbia in August 2000, just before the presidential elections and upheaval that toppled Slobodan Milošević. A cabinet-level post was created for him and in June 2001 Andjelić was named the first director of the Information Technology and Internet Development Agency.

In this position Andjelić authored the National Information Society Policy, introduced intellectual property rights regulation and fought against software piracy. He negotiated strategic partnership agreement with Microsoft in the summer of 2001, and with other major ICT companies later that year. Andjelić also begun the process of liberalization in the telecommunication sector.

During 2002 he helped reinvigorate eSEE Initiative of the Stability Pact, which culminated in the regional conference in Belgrade where countries of the region signed a pact to work together on the rapid fulfillment of the eEurope goals.

Also during 2002 Andjelić was named a temporary administrator of the mobile operator "Mobtel" (now Telenor Serbia). In four months he restructured the company effecting savings of 1 million Euro per month and negotiating a 100 million Euro contract for new equipment with Ericsson.

Following the assassination of Đinđić, Andjelić went back to private business. He established an information security company and published a magazine "Security". In the fall of 2003 Andjelić organized a major regional conference on information security to raise awareness among the policymakers and promote data protection standards.

In 2005 Andjelić and several of his friends from the Đinđić administration formed Altis Capital, a corporate finance and strategic management advisory firm based in Belgrade. In parallel Andjelić went back to school and earned a master's degree in business from Grenoble Graduate School of Business in 2006. He is currently writing his PhD thesis on valuing companies in transition economies.

== Humanitarian and activist work ==
When the civil war in Bosnia started in 1992, Andjelić and a group of friends founded Serbian-American Alliance of New England, a humanitarian organization assisting the victims of war in former Yugoslavia. Several hundred tonnes of clothes, canned and dried food and medicine were sent to the war affected area. He also organized a medical air-lift for fifty six wounded children to be treated in the hospitals in the United States. The same year he helped establish Serbian Orthodox Church in Boston, the only region in the United States with Serbian immigrant population that did not have its own house of worship.

During this time Andjelić was also active in trying to change the United States policy towards Serbia. His letters and opinions appeared in the Boston Globe, the New York Times and the Foreign Affairs among others, and he actively lobbied the members of Congress to support opposition to Milošević.

Andjelić was also involved in the strategic national security issues, particularly in the 3C+I area and he volunteered as a part of the team that formulated the National Security Strategy for the Union of Serbia and Montenegro. In 2001 he joined the Atlantic Council, an ATA member organization, where he is a member of the board. He is active in promoting NATO membership for Serbia and a quick accession to the EU.

== Legal problems ==
In January 2006 Andjelić was arrested by the government of the Prime-Minister Koštunica, a key antagonist of the former prime-minister Đinđić, for the "misuse of official powers" while being temporary administrator of the mobile operator "Mobtel". As of November 2022 the charges were neither filed nor dismissed, however investigation was not officially closed, effectively removing Andjelić from the public life and preventing him from holding any appointments.
