= Tatomir Anđelić =

Serbian mathematician

Tatomir P. Anđelić (Serbian Cyrillic Татомир П. Анђелић ) was a Serbian mathematician, academic and an expert in mechanics.

== Biography ==
Tatomir P. Anđelić was born on November 11, 1903, in a small village Bukovica, near Mrcajevci between towns of Čačak and Kraljevo in the family of six children. His mother Dmitra was illiterate, but his father Pavle, a landowner with rudimentary schooling, was a people's democratic delegate.

He finished elementary school in town of Mrčajevci in 1914, and resumed his education after the World War I in 1919. In one year, he successfully passed six grades of then gymnasium, and his senior grade passed successfully in town of Čačak in 1922.

On his own accord he studied mathematics, physics and astronomy at the University of Heidelberg in Germany, from 1922 until 1927. He spent the 1927–1928 academic year at the University of Belgrade in the Department of Philosophy. As a scientist he was most influenced by Mihailo Petrović (1868–1943), Milutin Milanković (1879–1958) and Anton Bilimović (1879–1970).

From October 1928 until September 1945 he taught mathematics in high school, mostly in the Second Belgrade's Gymnasium and First Belgrade Gymnasium. At the same time, he was employed by the University of Belgrade part-time as teacher's assistant at the department of mechanics in the class of Professor Bilimović.

A school in Mrčajevci is named after him.
