= Prince George William of Hanover =

German nobleman (1915–2006)

Prince George William
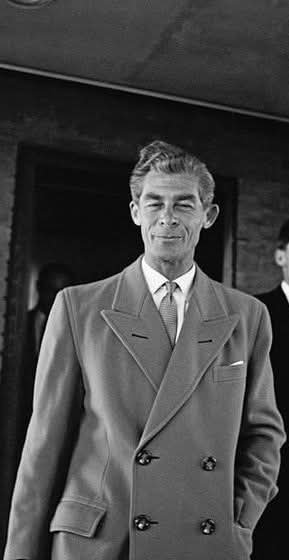
- George William, circa 1960s
- Born: 25 March 1915; Brunswick, Brunswick, German Empire
- Died: 8 January 2006 (aged 90); Munich, Bavaria, Germany
- Burial: Schliersee, Bavaria, Germany
- Spouse: Princess Sophie of Greece and Denmark (m. 1946; died 2001)
- Issue: Prince Welf; Prince Georg; Princess Friederike
- House: Hanover
- Father: Ernest Augustus, Duke of Brunswick
- Mother: Princess Victoria Louise of Prussia

Prince George William of Hanover and Cumberland (Georg Wilhelm Ernst August Friedrich Axel Prinz von Hannover; 25 March 1915 – 8 January 2006) was the second-eldest son of Ernest Augustus, Duke of Brunswick, and his wife Princess Victoria Louise of Prussia, the only daughter of Wilhelm II, German Emperor, and Augusta Victoria of Schleswig-Holstein.

George William's wife was a sister of Prince Philip, Duke of Edinburgh, and his children are thus first cousins of King Charles III. His sister, Frederica, became Queen of the Hellenes as the consort of King Paul of Greece.

== Life ==
George William was christened on 10 May 1915 in Brunswick. The prince's godparents included Maria Christina of Austria, Prince Axel of Denmark, and Princess Olga of Hanover and Cumberland who held the infant prince over the baptismal font.

From 1930 through 1934, Prince George William attended the elite boarding school Schule Schloss Salem in Überlingen on Lake Constance. Schule Schloss Salem was co-founded by the prince's uncle, the last Chancellor of the German Empire, Prince Maximilian of Baden, and educator Kurt Hahn in 1920.

With George William having completed his law studies at the University of Göttingen in 1948, he was approached by his brother-in-law, Berthold, Margrave of Baden, to take over the management of the Salem Castle School, which had since been closed due to the Second World War. A former student of the institution, the prince then went to Scotland with his wife to meet with Kurt Hahn, the founder of the school, and to visit Gordonstoun, the establishment that the latter founded when he had to flee Nazi Germany because of his Jewish origins. The family remained in Salem until 1959, when George William gave up his post of school director. Together with his wife, as well as his three brothers, he took part in the ship tours organized by his sister Queen Frederica and her husband King Paul of Greece in 1954 and 1956, which became known as the “Cruises of the Kings” and were attended by over 100 royals from all over Europe.

The horse lover George William, who had belonged to the German eventing team before the Second World War, later built up the riding academy in Munich-Riem. For many years Prince George William was a member of the International Olympic Committee (IOC) and of the Deutscher Olympischer Sportbund (DOSB), the German NOC.

Prince George William of Hanover lived in Schliersee, near Munich, and died in Munich in 2006 aged 90. His wife, Sophie, sister of Prince Philip of Greece and Denmark, later Duke of Edinburgh, consort of Queen Elizabeth II of the United Kingdom, died in 2001.

== Marriage ==
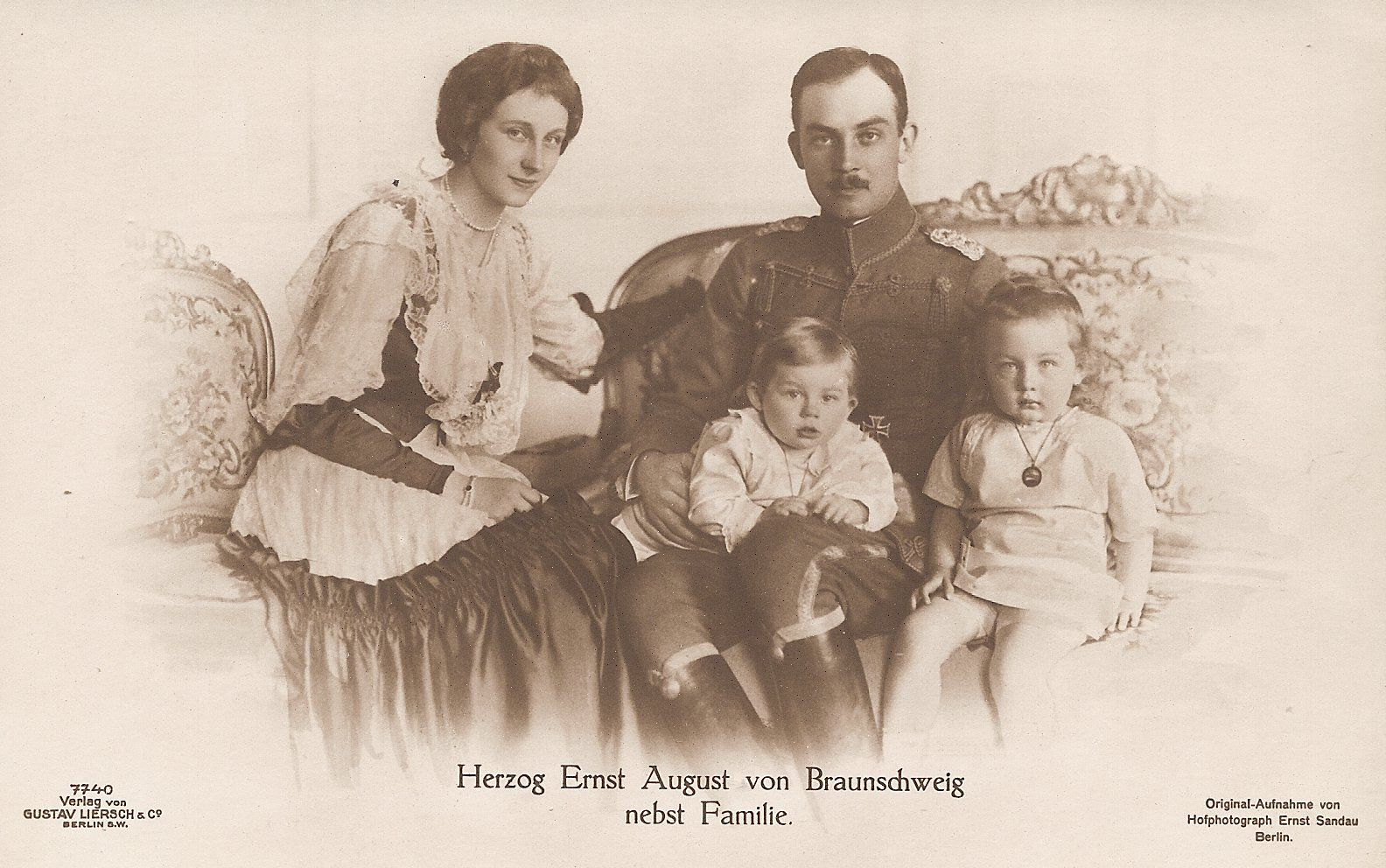
Ernest Augustus with Prince George William on his lap, 1916

On 23 April 1946 in Salem, Baden-Württemberg, Germany, Prince George William married his third cousin Princess Sophie of Greece and Denmark, daughter of Prince Andrew of Greece and Denmark and Princess Alice of Battenberg, and the widow of Prince Christoph of Hesse. After consultations with the Foreign Office, Home Office and King George VI's private secretary, Sir Alan Lascelles, a ciphered telegram dated 18 April 1946 and crafted by Sir Albert Napier, permanent secretary to the Lord Chancellor, was transmitted from the British Foreign Office to the Foreign Adviser to the British Commander in Chief at Berlin:

"The Duke of Brunswick has formally applied to The King by letter of March 22nd for the consent of His Majesty under the Act 12 Geo. III, cap. 11 to the marriage of his son Prince George William with Princess Sophia Dowager Princess of Hesse. The marriage is understood to be taking place on April 23rd. Please convey to the Duke an informal intimation that in view of the fact that a state of war still exists between Great Britain and Germany, His Majesty is advised that the case is not one in which it is practicable for His consent to be given in the manner contemplated by the Act."

They had three children: Welf (1947–1981), Georg (born 1949) and Friederike (born 1954).

== Ancestry ==
George William was a descendant of Victoria of the United Kingdom and Albert, Prince Consort through their eldest daughter Victoria, Princess Royal, the wife of Frederick III, German Emperor. He was born a Prince of the United Kingdom of Great Britain and Ireland.

Ancestors of Prince George William of Hanover

8. George V of Hanover
4. Ernest Augustus, Crown Prince of Hanover
9. Princess Marie of Saxe-Altenburg
2. Ernest Augustus, Duke of Brunswick
10. Christian IX of Denmark
5. Princess Thyra of Denmark
11. Princess Louise of Hesse-Kassel
1. Prince George William of Hanover
12. Frederick III, German Emperor
6. Wilhelm II, German Emperor
13. Victoria, Princess Royal
3. Princess Victoria Louise of Prussia
14. Frederick VIII, Duke of Schleswig-Holstein
7. Princess Augusta Victoria of Schleswig-Holstein-Sonderburg-Augustenburg
15. Princess Adelheid of Hohenlohe-Langenburg
