= 1992 Windsor Castle fire =

Fire at historic royal castle

- Date: 20 November 1992; 33 years ago
- Time: 11:15 GMT
- Duration: 15 hours
- Venue: Windsor Castle
- Location: Windsor, Berkshire, England; 51°29′4″N 00°36′12″W
- Cause: Curtain ignited by spotlight
- Deaths: 0
- Injuries: 6 minor
- Property damage: St George's Hall ceiling collapsed; Crimson Drawing Room gutted, Green Drawing Room damaged; Queen's Private Chapel.

On 20 November 1992, a major fire broke out in Windsor Castle, the largest inhabited castle in the world and one of the official residences of the British monarch. Beginning in the Queen's Private Chapel, it spread rapidly through the State Apartments and became one of the largest peacetime fire‑fighting operations in modern British history. More than 200 fire‑fighters brought the blaze under control after 15 hours.

Although no one was killed, the fire caused severe damage to the fabric of the castle. Over 100 rooms were affected, including St George's Hall, the Grand Reception Room and the State Dining Room. Much of the Royal Collection had been removed the previous day or salvaged during the fire, but several significant works were lost. The scale of the destruction was widely described as a national disaster.

A large salvage operation involving castle staff, contractors, the Royal Household and the Household Cavalry saved thousands of books, manuscripts, clocks, miniatures and works of art. Queen Elizabeth II returned to residence within two weeks, and parts of the castle reopened to visitors within days. The fire prompted public debate about the funding of royal residences and contributed to the Queen's decision to begin paying income tax, as well as to the opening of Buckingham Palace to the public to help finance the restoration.

The restoration, led by the conservation architects Donald Insall Associates, took five years and cost £36.5 million. Combining faithful reconstruction with new architectural work, including Giles Downes's hammer‑beam roof for St George's Hall, it was completed in 1997 and became one of the most significant conservation projects of its kind. The fire occurred during what the Queen later described as her annus horribilis.

== Timeline of the fire ==
=== Early stages ===
The fire began at 11:15 am when a spotlight, in the Queen's Private Chapel, was pressing against a curtain which caused a fire. Members of the Royal Household were in the chapel at the time inspecting works of art. A fire alarm sounded in the watch room of the castle's fire brigade, manned by the Chief Fire Officer, Marshall Smith. The fire's location was indicated by a light on the brigade's grid‑map of the castle. The Brunswick Tower was initially illuminated, but additional lights soon began to flash, showing that the fire had spread rapidly to neighbouring rooms.

A major section of the State Apartments was soon ablaze. Building contractors working nearby attempted to tackle the fire with extinguishers. The 30-foot-long (9.1 m) curtains eventually fell to the floor and continued to burn, while those present removed paintings from the chapel until the heat and falling embers forced them to withdraw at 11:32 am.

At 11:36 am, Smith activated a switch to alert the control room at Reading fire station. He then triggered the castle's public fire alarm and telephoned the Royal Berkshire Fire and Rescue Service on a direct line, stating, "Windsor Castle here; we have got a fire in the Private Chapel. Come to the Quadrangle as arranged". The castle maintained its own 20‑person fire brigade, including six full‑time staff. Equipped with a Land Rover and pump tender, they were based in stables two miles south of the castle and arrived at 11:41 am. Appliances from the Fire and Rescue Service reached the scene at 11:44 am. By 11:56 am, 17 pumping appliances had been ordered. An operation to remove furniture and works of art, involving castle staff, building contractors, and Prince Andrew, had commenced in rooms adjacent to the fire.

=== Subsequent events ===
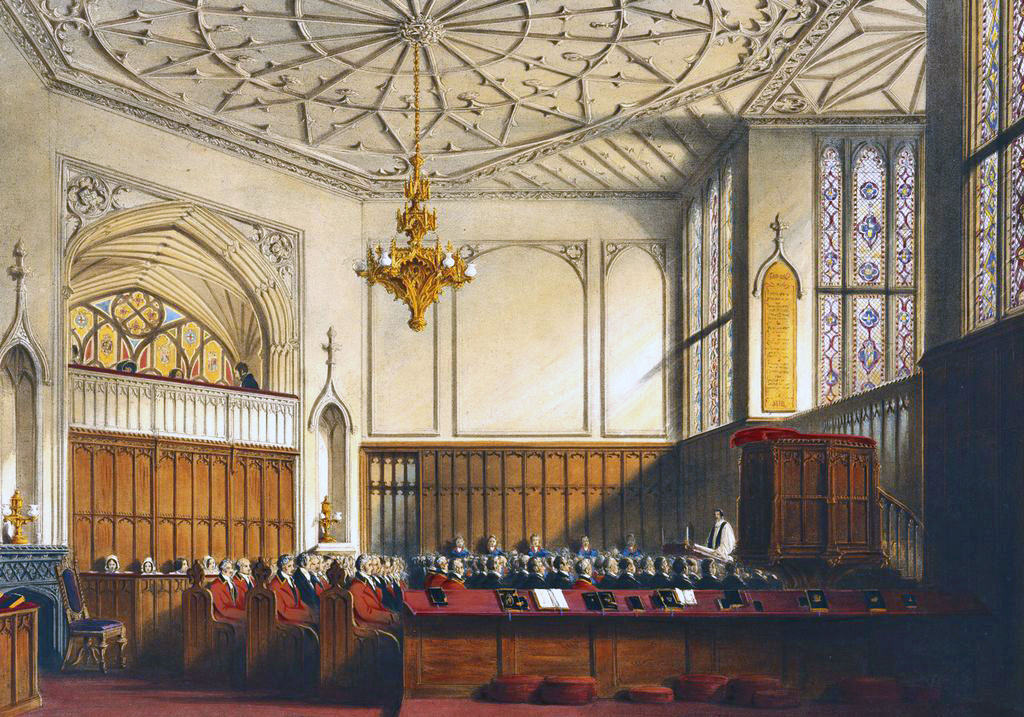
An 1848 lithograph of the Private Chapel by Joseph Nash, the location where the fire started

By 12:12 pm, there were 20 fire engines on site, and by 12:20 pm the number had risen to 35. More than 200 fire‑fighters had arrived from London, Buckinghamshire, Surrey, and Oxfordshire, as well as from Berkshire. The Fire Incident Commander was David Harper, Deputy Chief Fire and Rescue Officer of the Royal Berkshire Fire and Rescue Service; the Chief Officer, Garth Scotford, was out of the country on holiday.

By 12:20 pm, the fire had spread to St George's Hall, a banqueting hall and the largest of the State Apartments. The number of fire appliances now totalled 39, with 225 fire‑fighters in attendance. Hoses were directed at all levels of the building surrounding the fire. As an indication of the scale of the incident, there had been only one 30‑appliance fire in the whole of Greater London since 1973.

By 1:30 pm, tradesmen had created fire‑breaks at the southern wall of the Green Drawing Room (at the end of St George's Hall on the east side of the Quadrangle) and at the north‑west corner at Chester Tower, where it joins the Grand Corridor. By this time, the fire‑fighters had begun to bring the blaze under control, although the roof of the State Apartments had started to collapse.

At 3:30 pm, the floors of the Brunswick Tower collapsed. Fire‑fighters had to withdraw temporarily to locate three men who were briefly lost in the smoke, and withdrew again when part of the roof collapsed and personnel were temporarily unaccounted for.

At 4:15 pm, the fire revived in the Brunswick Tower. As night fell, the blaze was concentrated in the tower, which by 6:30 pm was engulfed by flames up to 50 feet (15 m) high.

At 7:00 pm, the roof of St George's Hall collapsed.

By 8:00 pm, after burning for nine hours, the fire was under control, although it continued to burn for a further three hours.

By 11:00 pm, the main fire was extinguished, and by 2:30 am the last secondary fires had been put out. Pockets of fire remained until the early hours of the morning, some 15 hours after the blaze began. Sixty fire‑fighters with eight appliances remained on duty for several more days. The fire had spread rapidly due to the large cavities and voids in the roof. A total of 1.5 million gallons (7 million litres) of water from the mains supply, a reservoir‑fed hydrant, a swimming pool, a pond, and the nearby River Thames was used to fight the fire.

== Salvage operation ==
Apart from the several hundred fire‑fighters directly involved in tackling the blaze, staff and tradesmen assisted the castle's fire brigade and volunteer salvage corps in moving furniture and works of art from the endangered apartments. Items removed included a 150-foot (46 m) table and a 120-foot (37 m) carpet from the Waterloo Chamber, which were taken to the safety of the castle's riding school. It was an extensive operation: 300 clocks, a collection of miniatures, thousands of valuable books and historic manuscripts, and old master drawings from the Royal Library were saved. On the instructions of fire officers, heavy chests and tables were left in place. All other items were placed on large sheets of tarpaulin in the North Terrace and Quadrangle, and the police called in dozens of removal vans from across the home counties to transport the objects to other parts of the castle.

Members of the Royal Household, including the 13th Earl of Airlie, assisted in the operation. Staff of the Royal Collection Department were particularly active, among them the director, Geoffrey de Bellaigue; the Surveyor of Pictures, Christopher Lloyd; the Deputy Surveyor of the Queen's Works of Art, Hugh Roberts; the Curator of the Print Room, Jane Roberts; and the Librarian, Oliver Everett. The Household Cavalry arrived from nearby Combermere Barracks, and around 100 officers and men of the Life Guards proved invaluable in moving large and bulky items. In all, 125 castle staff, 125 contractors, 100 military personnel, and 20 Crown Estate staff took part in the salvage effort.

There had been no serious injuries and no deaths. Dean Lansdale, a decorator working in the Private Chapel, burnt his hands while removing the three or four pictures he rescued. He was treated in the royal surgery before being taken to hospital. A royal spokesman denied media reports that the surveyor of the Queen's pictures had suffered a heart attack. Five fire‑fighters were taken to hospital with minor injuries.

== Extent of damage to the castle ==
=== Structural damage ===
The major loss was to the fabric of the castle. The false ceiling in St George's Hall and the void for coal trucks beneath the floor had allowed the fire to spread, and it burned as far as the Chester Tower. Several ceilings collapsed. Apartments destroyed or badly damaged included the Crimson Drawing Room (completely gutted), the Green Drawing Room (badly damaged, though only partially destroyed by smoke and water), and the Queen's Private Chapel, which lost the double‑sided 19th‑century Henry Willis organ in the gallery between St George's Hall and the Private Chapel, as well as its oak panelling, glass, and altar.

St George's Hall survived with its walls largely intact, but the ceiling had collapsed. The State Dining Room in the Prince of Wales Tower and the Grand Reception Room were also devastated. In total, 100 rooms were affected by the fire. Smaller apartments damaged or destroyed included the Star Chamber, Octagon Room, Brunswick Tower (covered in 12 feet (3.5 m) of debris), Cornwall Tower, Prince of Wales Tower, Chester Tower, Holbein Room, and the Great Kitchen, which lost its plaster coving and most of its medieval timber. The external wall above the bay window of the Crimson Drawing Room (between the Prince of Wales and Chester Towers) was seriously calcified.

=== Contents ===
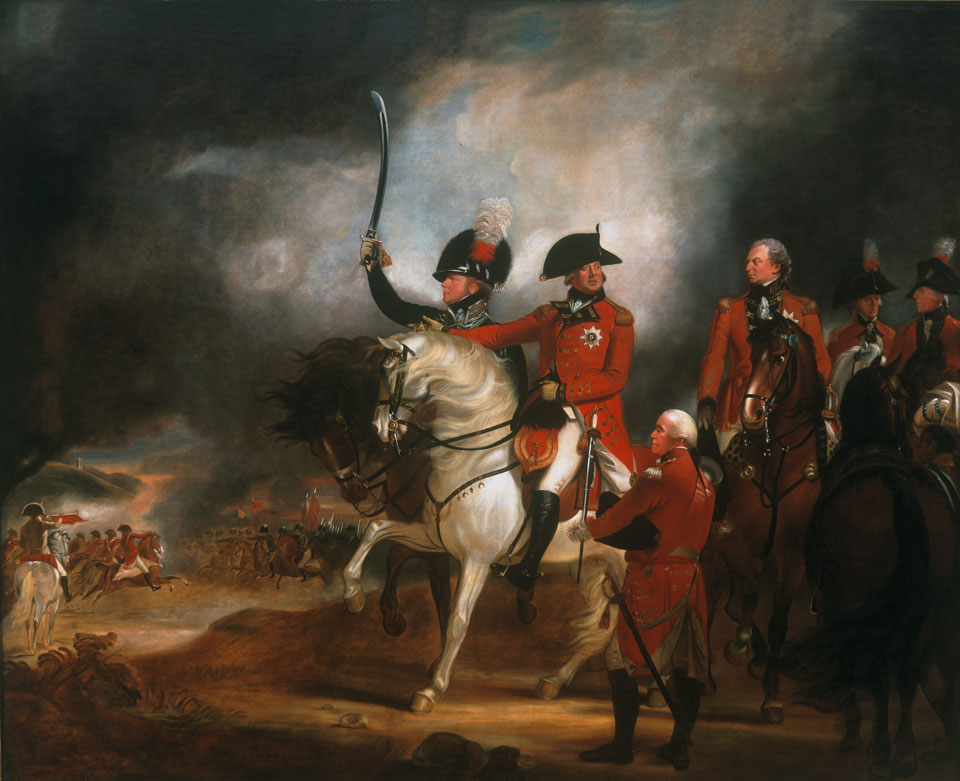
A smaller copy of George III and the Prince of Wales Reviewing Troops by William Beechey, a large painting destroyed in the fire

The most seriously damaged rooms had largely been emptied of their valuable contents the previous day, and some paintings were on loan to a travelling exhibition. Items from the Royal Collection that were lost included Sir William Beechey's equestrian portrait George III and the Prince of Wales Reviewing Troops, which at 13 feet (4 m) by 16 feet (5 m) was too large to remove; an 18 ft (5.5 m) 1820s sideboard by Morel and Seddon; several items of porcelain; several chandeliers; the Willis organ; and part of the 1851 Great Exhibition Axminster carpet. Peter Brooke, then Secretary of State for National Heritage, described the fire as a national disaster.

=== Tourism ===
Tourists were allowed into the precincts within three days. Queen Elizabeth II returned to residence a fortnight later. The Gallery and Queen Mary's Dolls' House reopened in December. The State Apartments reopened in 1993 after rewiring was completed, with all major rooms open by Easter. Only St George's Hall and the Grand Reception Room remained closed. In total, 11 of the 15 principal rooms of the State Apartments were open, with two still undergoing long‑term restoration and two having been destroyed.

== Restoration project ==
=== Funding ===
It was initially feared that the restoration would cost £60 million, though the final cost was £36.5 million (equivalent to £77 million in 2024), and that drying out the castle would take 10 years. Occupied royal palaces such as Windsor Castle are too valuable to insure, and items in the Royal Collection are not insured against loss. An independent trust for private donations towards the cost of the restoration was announced on 16 February 1993 by the Queen's bank, Coutts. On 29 April 1993, it was announced that 70% of the cost would be met by charging the public for entry into the castle precincts and £8 for admission to Buckingham Palace for the next five years. The Queen contributed £2 million of her own money, and she agreed to begin paying income tax from 1993 onwards, making her the first British monarch to do so since the 1930s.

=== Planning ===
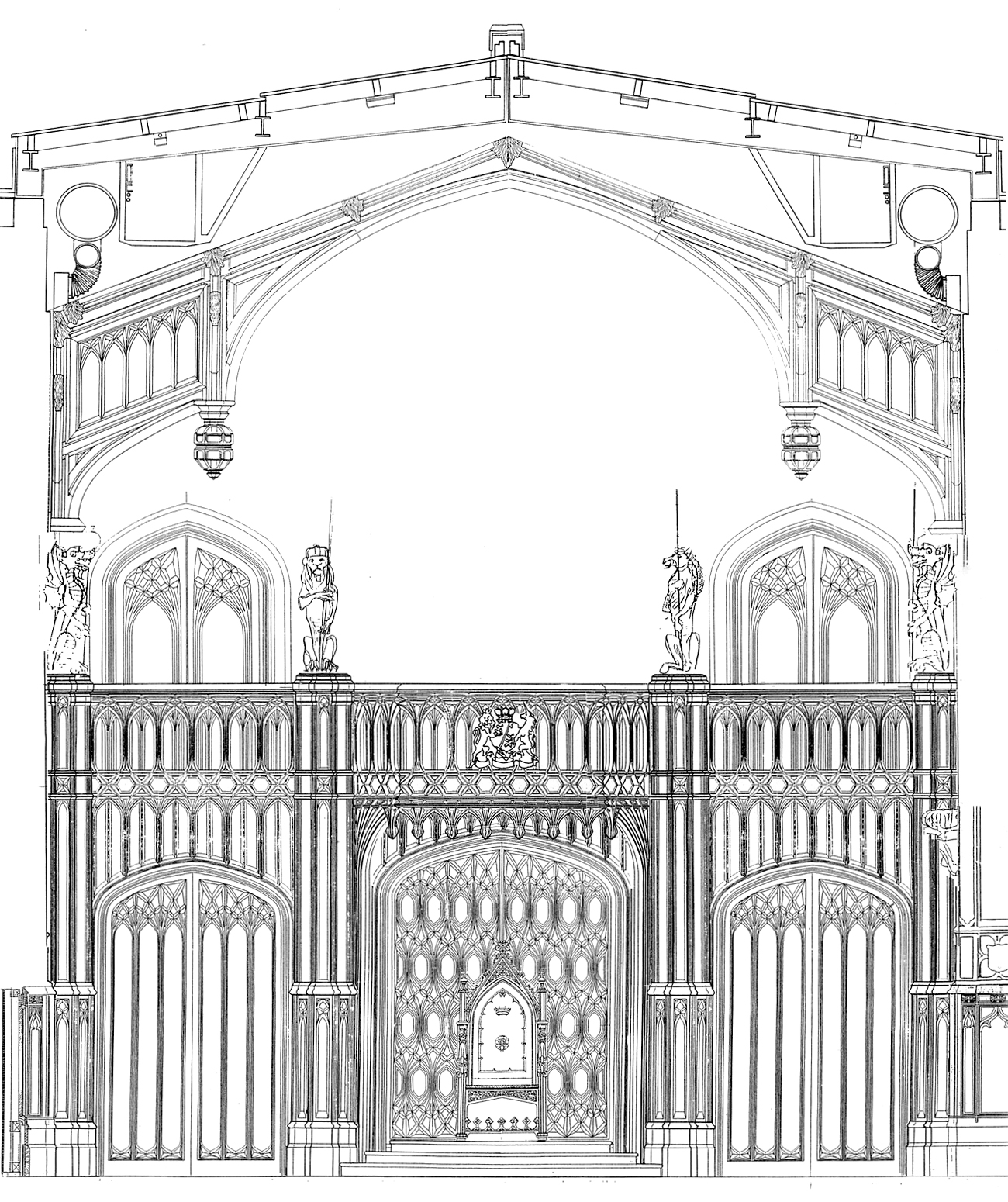
A diagram of the new St George's Hall's roof and woodwork

On 7 June 1994, details of the restoration project were announced. The architectural firm Donald Insall Associates was appointed by the Royal Household to take overall charge of the restoration, with Sidell Gibson responsible for the reconstruction of St George's Hall and the design of the new Lantern Lobby and Private Chapel. More than half the damaged and destroyed rooms, including the State and Octagon dining rooms, were to be restored as original. New designs were planned for the ceiling of St George's Hall (with steel reinforcing beams in the roof) and the East Screen, as well as the Queen's Private Chapel and the Stuart and Holbein Rooms. Only the Queen's Private Chapel and several modern rooms were to be restored in a contemporary style.

Designs were submitted to a Restoration Committee, chaired by Prince Philip, Duke of Edinburgh, with Charles, Prince of Wales, as deputy chairman. Members included David Ogilvy, 13th Earl of Airlie (Lord Chamberlain); Sir Hayden Phillips (Permanent Secretary of the Department of National Heritage); Norman St John-Stevas, Lord St John of Fawsley (Chairman of the Royal Fine Art Commission); Sir Jocelyn Stevens (Chairman of English Heritage); Frank Duffy (President of the Royal Institute of British Architects); and three senior palace officials.

The fire, catastrophic though it was, presented an opportunity for significant new architectural work. Although criticised by some who felt the designs lacked imagination, the architects argued that, given the history of the building and the surviving fabric, the new work had to be Gothic.

=== Execution ===
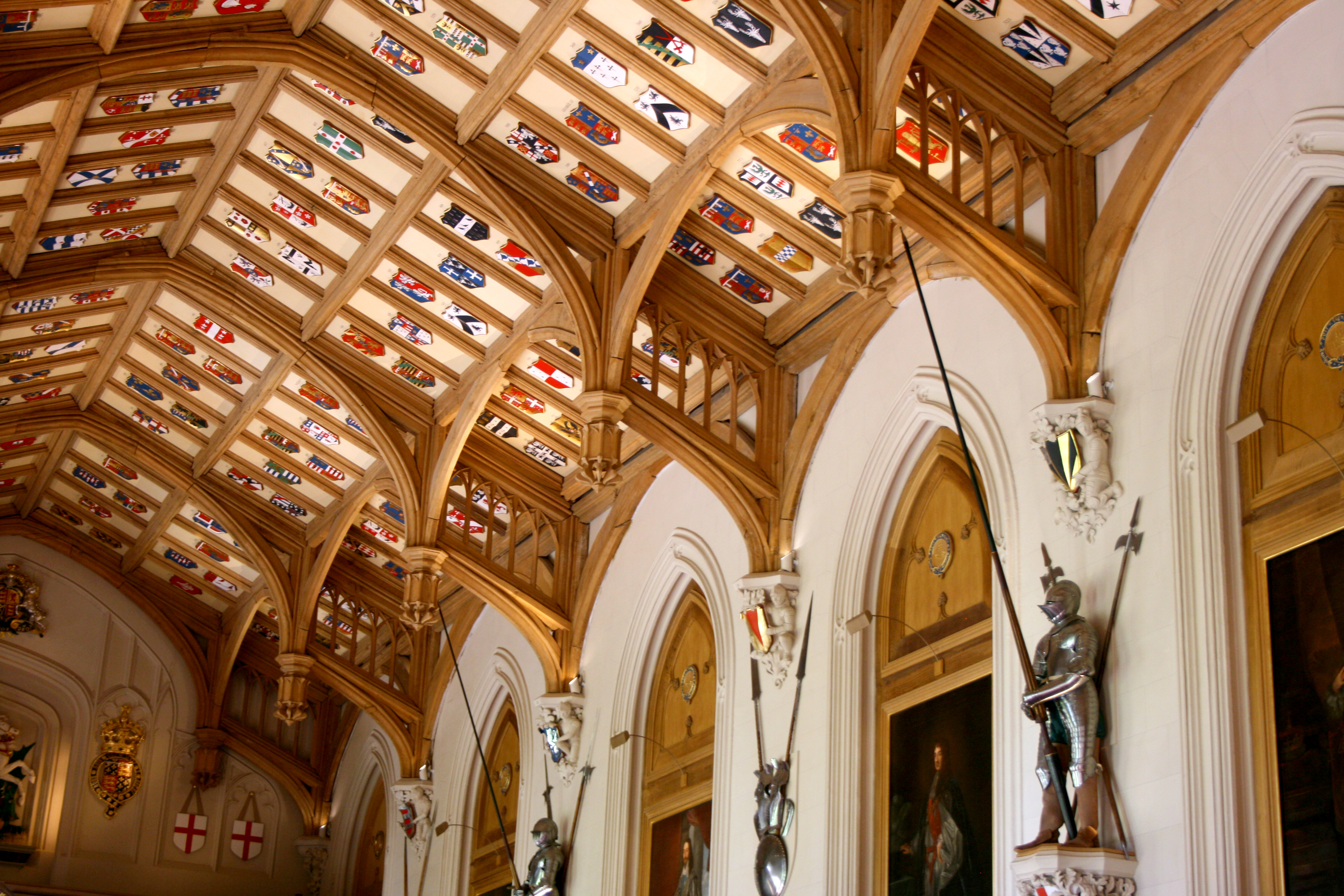
Giles Downes's new hammer-beam roof in St George's Hall, completed in 1997

New designs for St George's Hall and the Queen's Private Chapel were approved by the Queen on 24 January 1995. Designed by architect Giles Downes, the new roof for St George's Hall is an example of a hammer-beam ceiling. The new chapel and adjoining cloisters were realigned to form a processional route from the private apartments, through an octagonal vestibule, into St George's Hall. Downes's roof is the largest green-oak structure built since the Middle Ages and is decorated with brightly coloured shields celebrating the heraldic element of the Order of the Garter; the design attempts to create an illusion of additional height through the Gothic woodwork along the ceiling. Commentators have noted that Downes' work does much to compensate for the originally flawed proportions of the hall. The Lantern Lobby has oak columns forming a vaulted ceiling, imitating an arum lily.

The first stage of the structural restoration was completed in May 1996. Fitting‑out, originally planned to finish by spring 1998, was completed on 17 November 1997. The Queen held a reception in the newly restored hall for the architects and building contractors involved in the project.
