= Royal Collection Management Committee =

The Royal Collection Management Committee has control of the administration of the Royal Collection of the Sovereign of the United Kingdom, and is a part of the Royal Collection Department of the royal household.

Current (April 2025) members are:

- Sir Hugh Roberts, KCVO FSA (chairman)
- Neil Curtis, director of finance and corporate services
- Michelle Lockhart, director of commercial operations and engagement

Previous members include:

- Sir Jonathan Marsden, KCVO FSA
- Hon Lady Roberts, CVO
- Desmond Shawe-Taylor
- Mike Stevens, LVO FCA
- George Ruiz, ACA
- Ms Frances Dunkels
- Mrs Nuala McGourty
