= De Bellaigue =

De Bellaigue is a surname. Notable people with the surname include:

- Christopher de Bellaigue (born 1971), British journalist
- Geoffrey de Bellaigue (1931–2013), Surveyor of the Queen's Works of Art from 1972 to 1996
