= Print Room =

A print room is either a room or industrial building where printing takes place, or a room in an art gallery or museum.

Print Room may also refer to:

- Print Room, Windsor, at Windsor Castle
- Print Room (theatre), an Off-West End theatre located in the former Coronet Cinema in London
