= Tarleton helmet =

Napoleonic-era military headwear

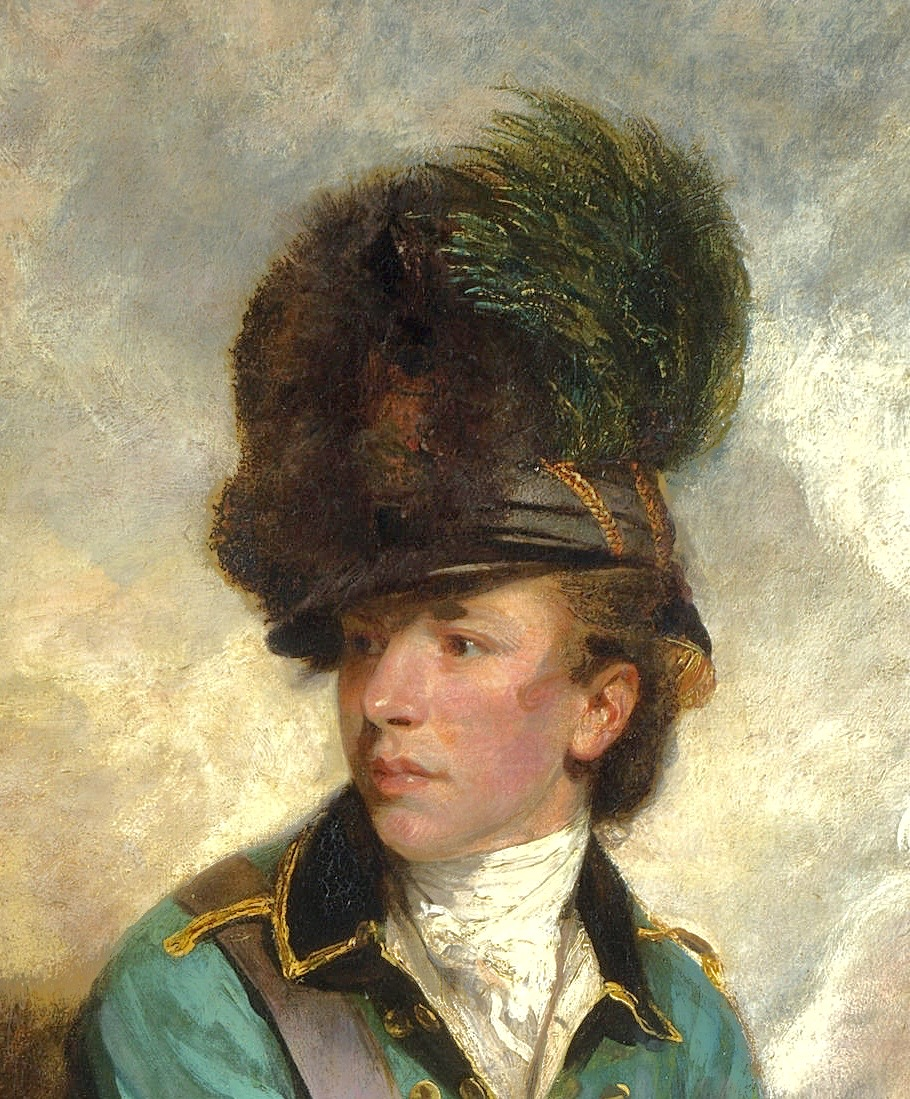
- Banastre Tarleton, detail of headgear from Joshua Reynolds 1782 portrait
- Type: Combat helmet
- Place of origin: Kingdom of Great Britain

Service history
- In service: 1789–1815
- Used by: Kingdom of Great Britain (1789–1801); United Kingdom of Great Britain and Ireland (1801–1815)
- Wars: American War of Independence; Napoleonic Wars

Production history
- Designer: Disputed

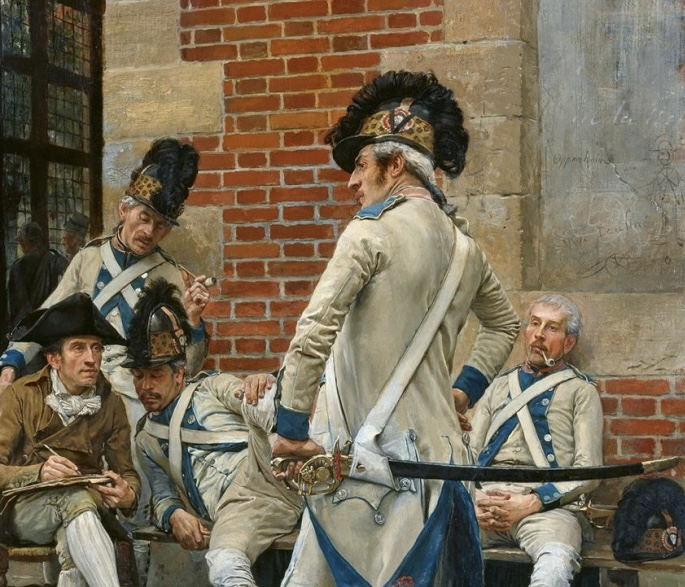
Late 18th century French soldiers wearing helmets of the Tarleton style

The Tarleton helmet, also called the Tarleton cap, is a type of 18th-century military headgear unofficially named in honour of then-Lieutenant Colonel Sir Banastre Tarleton. Described by contemporary sources as among the "handsomest" helmets of its period, it was generally worn by light infantry and light cavalry units. The helmet featured a leather or metal shell with neoclassical decorative elements, topped with a tall fur crest, commonly made of bearskin or horsehair (or wool for ranks below officers). It was in-service between approximately 1789 and 1815, though personnel wore it unofficially earlier.

== History ==
The helmet gained its name via association with Banastre Tarleton, a British military officer who served in the American War of Independence, It may have been introduced to the British Army by William Keppel around 1771, who was himself inspired by European dragoons wearing a similar helmet.

It is widely written that Tarleton adopted the helmet with the British Legion, wearing it himself in battle and in portraits by artists such as Sir Joshua Reynolds. The helmet continued to be worn by light dragoon regiments until about 1812, as well as by horse artillery units through the end of the Napoleonic Wars.

Similar helmet styles appeared across Europe, including the Raupenhelm ("caterpillar helmet") in Bavaria, which remained standard until replaced by the Pickelhaube following King Ludwig II of Bavaria's death in 1886.

== Influence and legacy ==
Elements of the Tarleton helmet's design, influenced dragoon helmets later in the 19th century. The then-Prince of Wales (and eventual King George IV) is thought to be shown wearing a version of the Tarleton helmet in Sir William Beechey's 1798 painting George III and the Prince of Wales Reviewing Troops.
