= Schlosshotel Kronberg =

Château in Kronberg im Taunus, Hesse, near Frankfurt am Main

Coordinates: 50°11′20″N 8°30′36″E

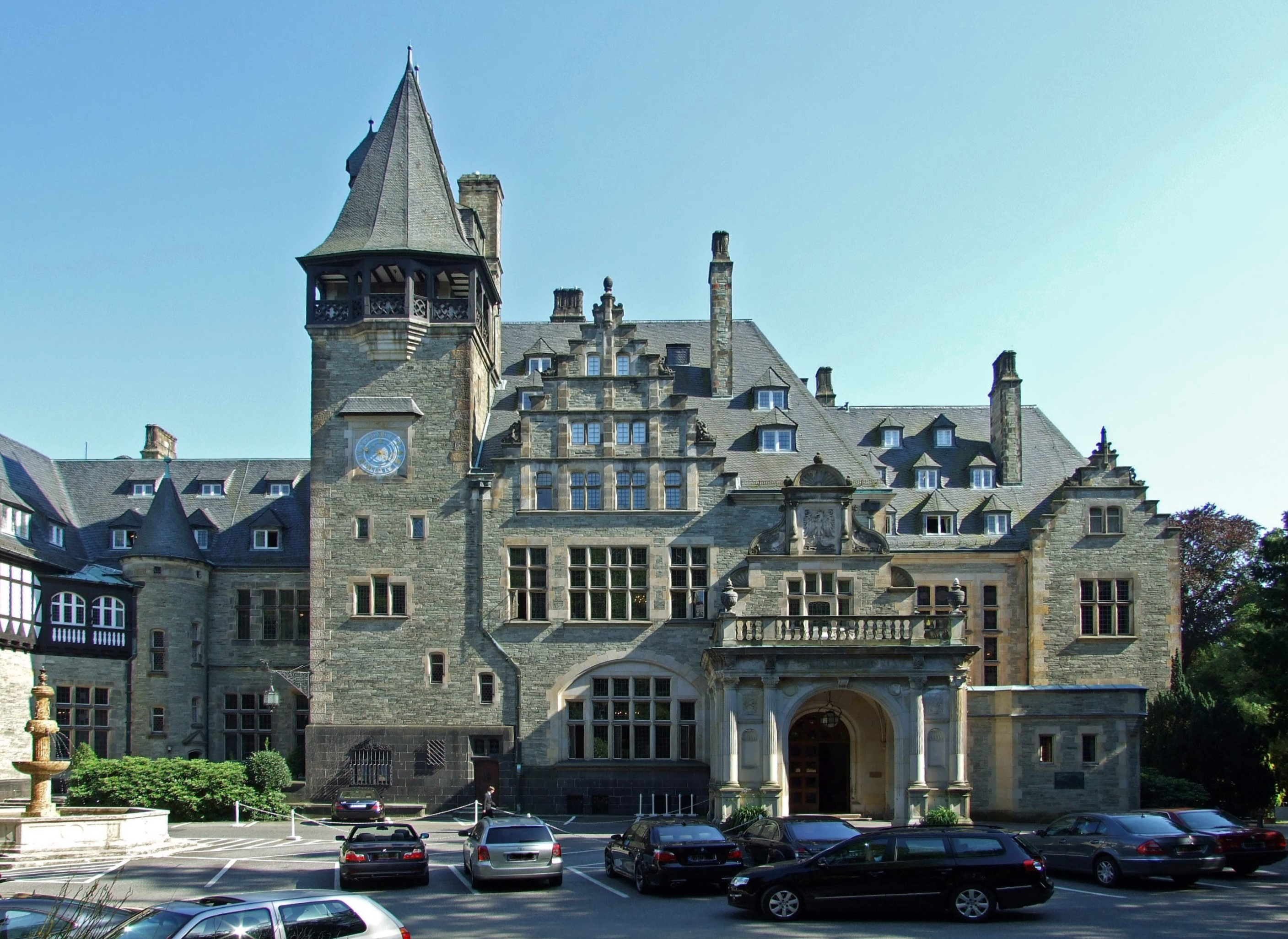
Schloss Kronberg

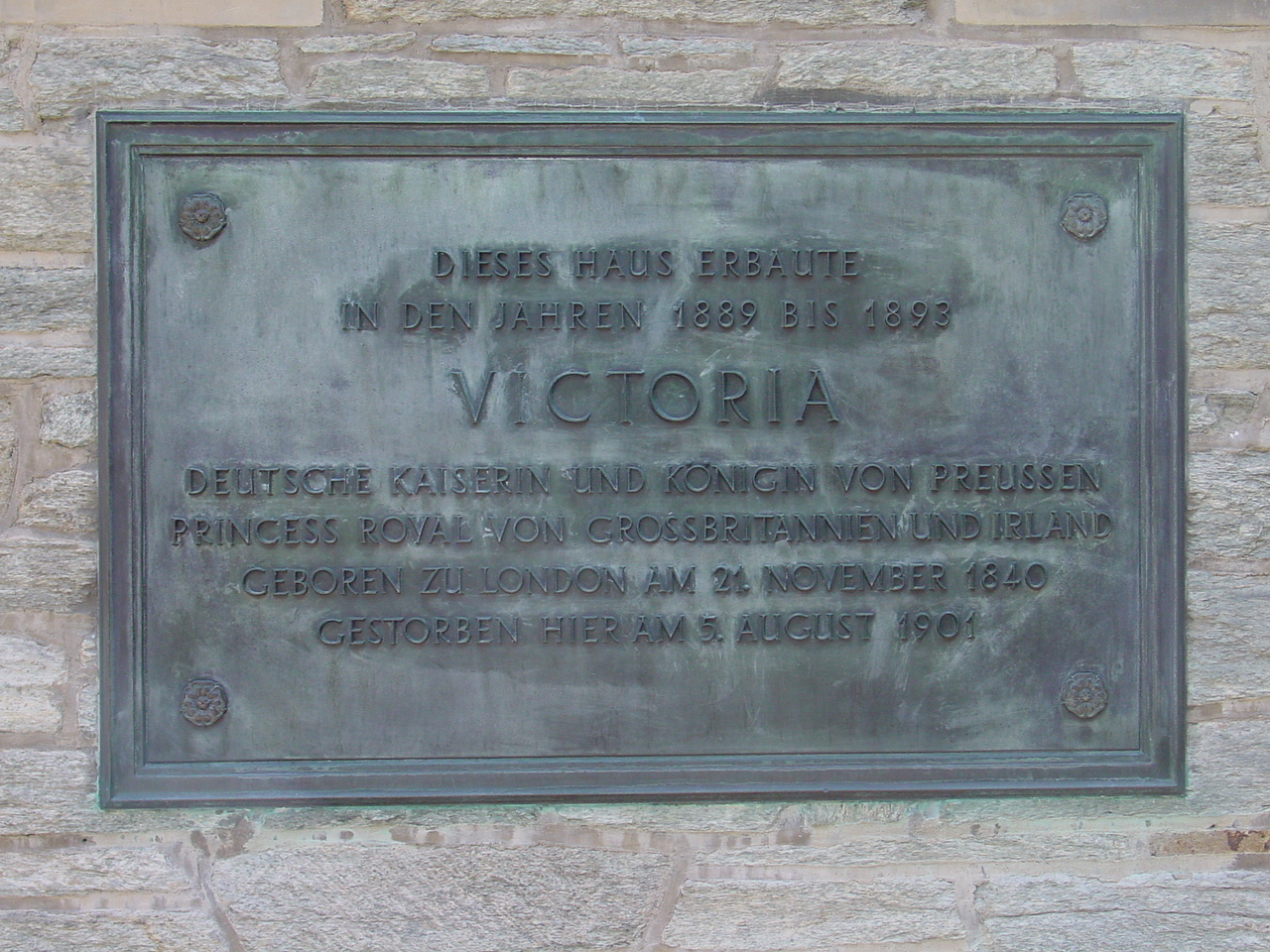
Plaque on the facade of Schloss Hotel Kronberg

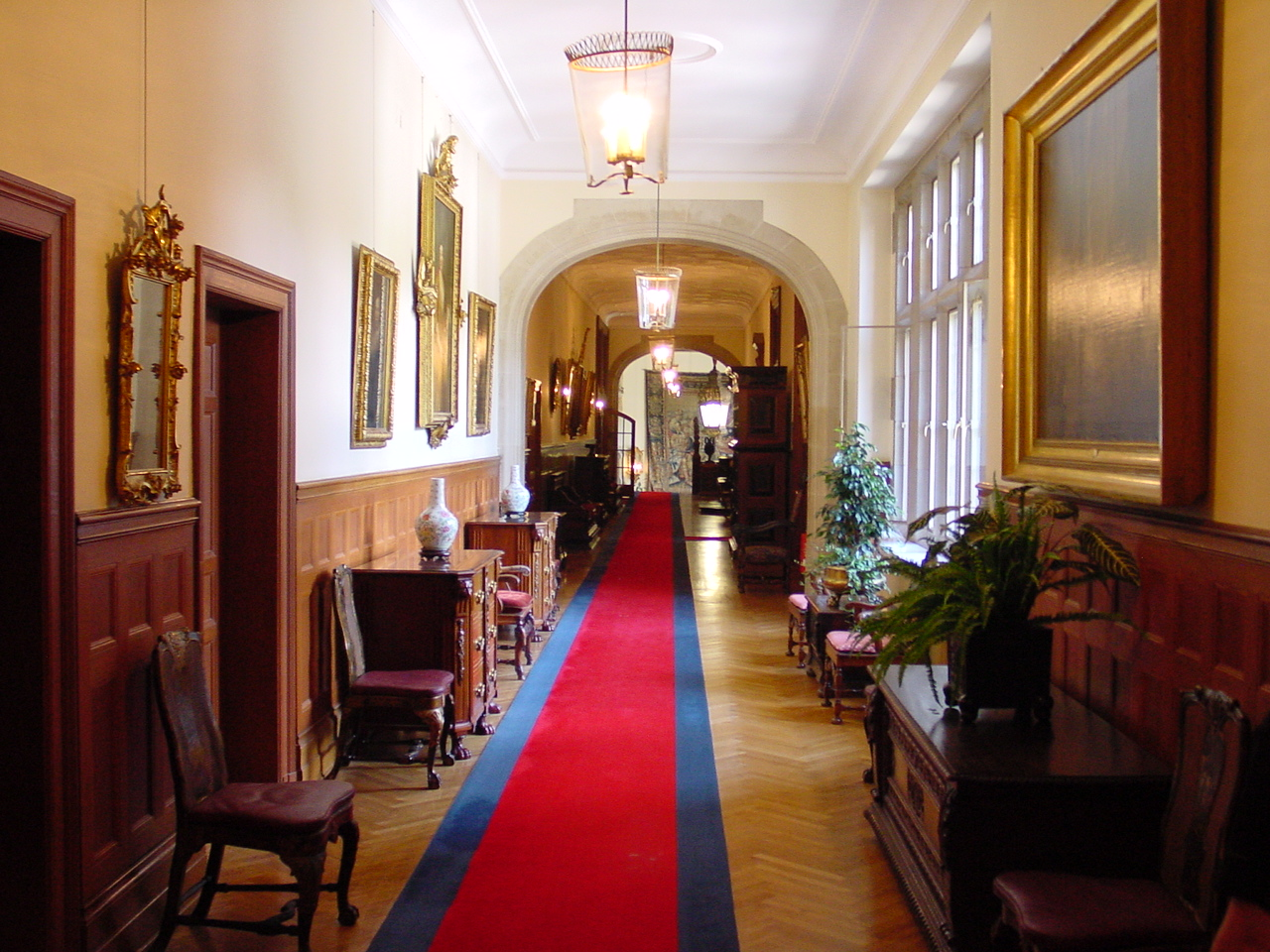
Main hallway of Schloss Hotel Kronberg

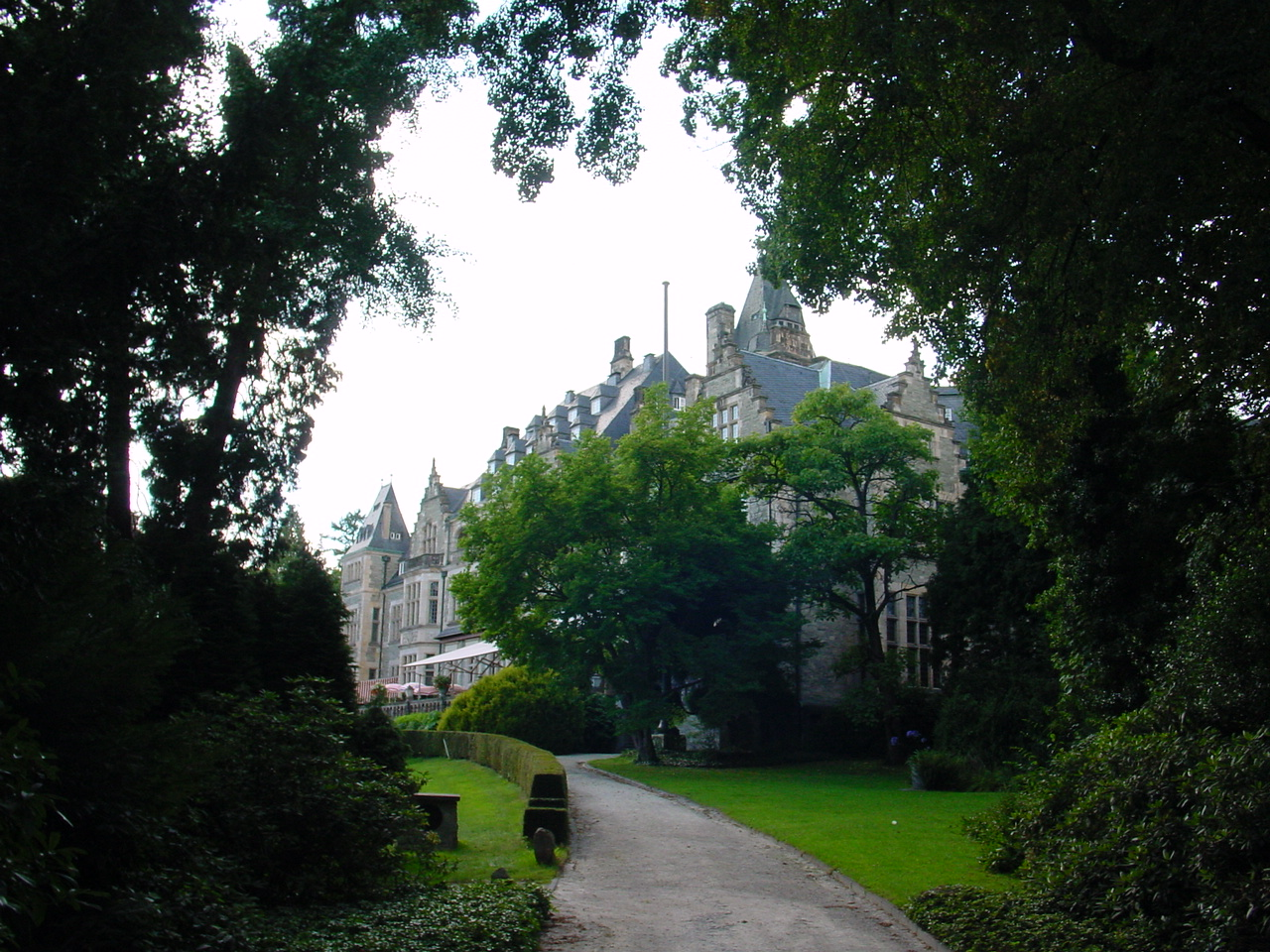
Rear view of Schloss Hotel Kronberg

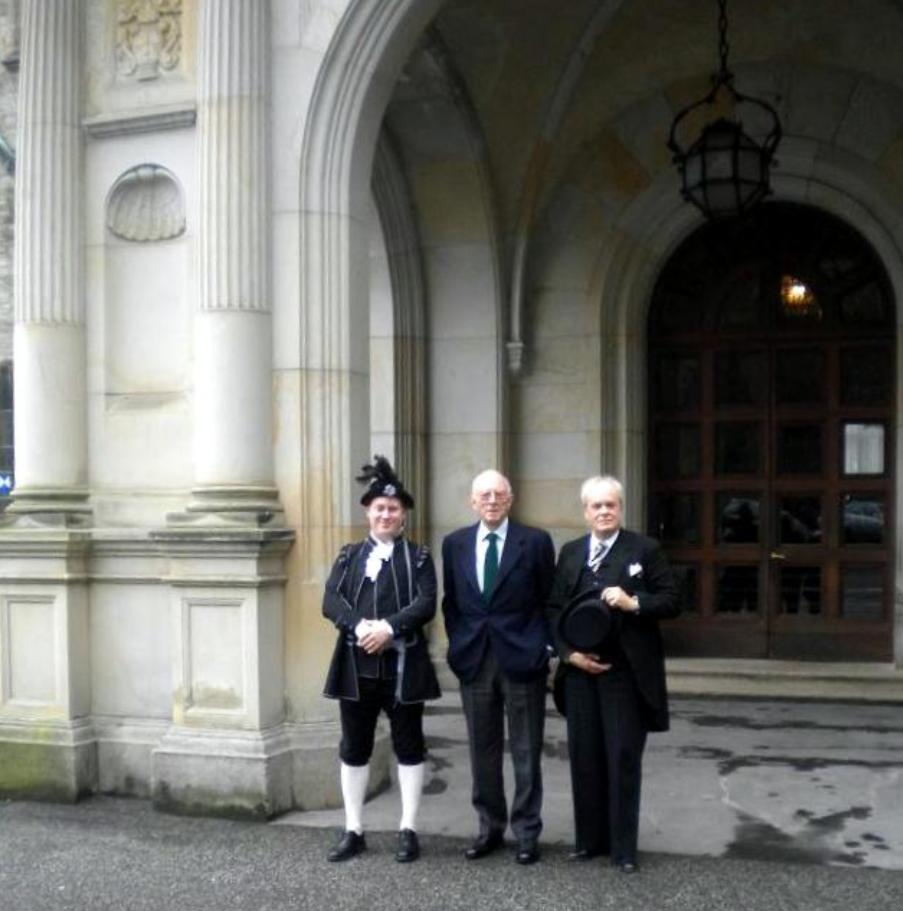
Landgrave Moritz in front of the hotel after meeting with visitors from Sweden in 2010

Schlosshotel Kronberg (Castle Hotel Kronberg) in Kronberg im Taunus, Hesse, near Frankfurt am Main, was built between 1889 and 1893 for the dowager German Empress Victoria and originally named Schloss Friedrichshof (Friedrichshof Castle) in honour of her late husband, Emperor Frederick III (Friedrich III).

Today the castle is a five-star hotel which belongs, together with the accompanying park, to the House of Hesse.

== History ==
=== 19th century ===
The Empress, the eldest daughter of Queen Victoria of the United Kingdom and Prince Albert of Saxe-Coburg and Gotha, spent most of her time at the castle until her death in 1901 when the castle, with its entire contents, art collection and the Empress's correspondence, were inherited by the Empress's youngest daughter, Princess Margaret of Prussia, Landgravine of Hesse.

=== 20th century ===
After World War II, Friedrichshof was used as an officer's club by the military authorities during the American occupation.

Princess Margaret's son Wolfgang, fearing for the family jewels, had buried them in a zinc-lined box in the subcellar of the castle. On 5 November 1945, the manager of the club, Captain Kathleen Nash, discovered the jewels and together with her future husband, Colonel Jack Durant, and Major David Watson, stole the treasure and took the jewels out of Germany. Many of the pieces were broken up and the gems sold separately, ruining the priceless heirlooms of the House of Hesse. In early 1946, Princess Margaret discovered the theft when the family wanted to use the jewels for the wedding of Princess Sophia who was preparing to remarry. Princess Sophia and Landgravine Margaret denounced it to the Frankfurt authorities; the culprits were imprisoned in August 1951. Major Watson was sentenced to three years, but paroled early. Captain Nash was sentenced to five years and Colonel Durant was sentenced to fifteen years. Only 10 percent of what had been stolen was recovered and returned to the Hesse family.

Author Charles Higham claimed that Anthony Blunt, an MI5 agent and Soviet spy, acting on orders from the British royal family, made a successful secret trip to Schloss Friedrichshof towards the end of the war to retrieve sensitive letters between the Duke of Windsor and Adolf Hitler and other leading Nazis. What is certain is that King George VI sent the Royal Librarian, Sir Owen Morshead, accompanied by Blunt, then working part-time in the Royal Library as well as for British intelligence, to Friedrichshof in March 1945 to secure papers relating to the German Empress Victoria, the eldest child of Queen Victoria. The papers rescued by Morshead and Blunt, and those returned by the American authorities from Chicago, were deposited in the Royal Archives.

Frankfurt American High School's senior prom of 1952, held at Friedrichshof, was featured in Life magazine that June.

The building suffered from a fire in 1967.

=== 21st century ===
The hotel was used as a filming location for the 2021 film Spencer, where its interiors doubled for Sandringham House.

== See also ==
- List of hotels in Germany
