= Director of the Royal Collection =

Servant of the British monarch in charge of art

The Director of the Royal Collection is head of the Royal Collection Department, a department of the Royal Household of the Sovereign of the United Kingdom. The department is responsible for the day-to-day management and upkeep of the art collection of the British royal family; held in trust for the nation and successive monarchs, it is one of the largest and most important art collections in the world. It contains over 7,000 paintings, 40,000 watercolours and drawings, about 150,000 old master prints, as well as historical photographs, tapestries, furniture, ceramics, books, and the Crown Jewels of the United Kingdom. The Director of the Royal Collection is also an ex-officio trustee of Historic Royal Palaces.

Although containing items acquired centuries earlier, the post is relatively new, having been established only in 1987. The inaugural office holder was Sir Oliver Millar.

== List of directors of the Royal Collection ==
- Sir Oliver Millar, GCVO FBA 1987-1988
- Sir Geoffrey de Bellaigue, KCVO FBA 1988-1996
- Sir Hugh Roberts, KCVO FSA 1996-2010
- Sir Jonathan Marsden, KCVO FSA 2010–2017
- Tim Knox, FSA 2018-Present
