= Theft of the Hesse crown jewels =

In 1945, four members of the United States Army—Captain Kathleen Nash (later Durant), Colonel Jack Durant, Major David Watson, and Technician Fifth Grade Roy Carlton—stole valuables worth an estimated $36 million (2021 value) from Schloss Friedrichshof, a 19th-century castle in Hesse, Germany. The stolen items, which included jewellery, ornate tableware, family bibles, and snuff boxes belonging to the House of Hesse, had been hidden in the castle during World War II to protect them from bombing raids.

The valuables were inventoried, individually wrapped, and stored in a zinc-lined waterproof wooden box, which was buried beneath concrete and concealed by a false wall in the basement of the castle on October 31, 1944. American forces reached the castle on March 29, 1945, and requisitioned it for use as an officers' club in April. Captain Nash was placed in charge of the mess section and the safekeeping of the castle’s contents. Despite heightened security, multiple thefts occurred prior to November. Durant was assigned to Germany in August, with Watson later appointed as his quartermaster.

In November, the box was discovered—either by Carlton or Nash’s assistant—and moved to Nash’s room, where she opened it and removed the contents. She informed Durant, who then asked Watson to research regulations on abandoned German property. Watson was fully involved by November 8, and the three met to decide the fate of the valuables. Initially planning to keep only a few items, they ultimately chose to take everything.

The discovery was reported to the Hesse family the following day. On November 10, Heinrich Lange, manager of the Schloss Friedrichshof estate, requested Nash to formalize the discovery and arrange its return, but no action was taken. By January 1946, the family reported the suspected theft to the US Army office responsible for protecting German artifacts. A direct appeal to the Army's Criminal Investigation Division in mid-April led to an investigation that lasted until June, resulting in the arrests of Nash and Durant in Chicago and Watson in Frankfurt. Carlton avoided trial by agreeing to testify.

All except Carlton were sentenced to hard labor: Nash received five years, Watson three, and Durant fifteen years as the ringleader. Nash briefly won an appeal but was re-imprisoned after the government successfully challenged it. Watson was paroled in 1947 and received a presidential pardon from Dwight D. Eisenhower in 1957. Durant’s appeals failed, and he served his full sentence. Over half of the stolen jewels and most of the precious metals were never recovered, and many of the returned items had significantly depreciated in value.

== Background ==
=== Princes Philipp and Christoph of Hesse ===
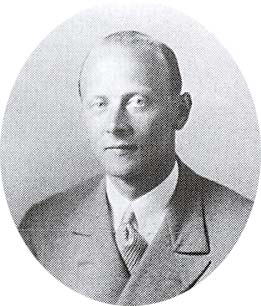
Prince Christoph of Hesse, c. 1921

Schloss Friedrichshof belonged to the House of Hesse-Kassel, the head of which at the time was Prince Philipp of Hesse. Both he and his brother, Prince Christoph of Hesse, had close relationships with Hermann Göring in the 1930s. Philipp joined the Nazi Party on October 1, 1930, while Christoph joined the party the following year and later the Schutzstaffel (SS) in 1932, reaching the rank of Oberführer by 1939. Christoph began working in the Forschungsamt by 1934, taking charge of it by 1935. In 1935 he was given a reserve commission in the Luftwaffe, volunteering to serve actively at the start of the war in September 1939 and briefly flying reconnaissance missions on the Eastern Front in June 1941 before an order which forbade German princes from taking part in combat was signed that year. He took part in various campaigns, twice in Sicily and once North Africa, and was later killed in a plane crash on October 7, 1943.

While the Nazi sympathies of both men is debated by historians, Philipp was an open admirer of Adolf Hitler. Philipp served in World War I, briefly participating in combat in Ukraine in 1918. He joined the Sturmabteilung (SA) some time prior to 1931, when he actively began participating in marches with the group. He joined the Nuremberg Rallies from 1933 until 1938, reaching the rank of Obergruppenführer in 1937. He later received the Golden Party Badge in 1939. He also served as a liaison between Benito Mussolini and Hitler, becoming a major link between the two during the Anschluss and the Munich Agreement of 1938, and the occupation of Czechoslovakia and the Invasion of Poland the following year. Between 1939 and 1940, he worked to keep the two apart, advocating for peace.

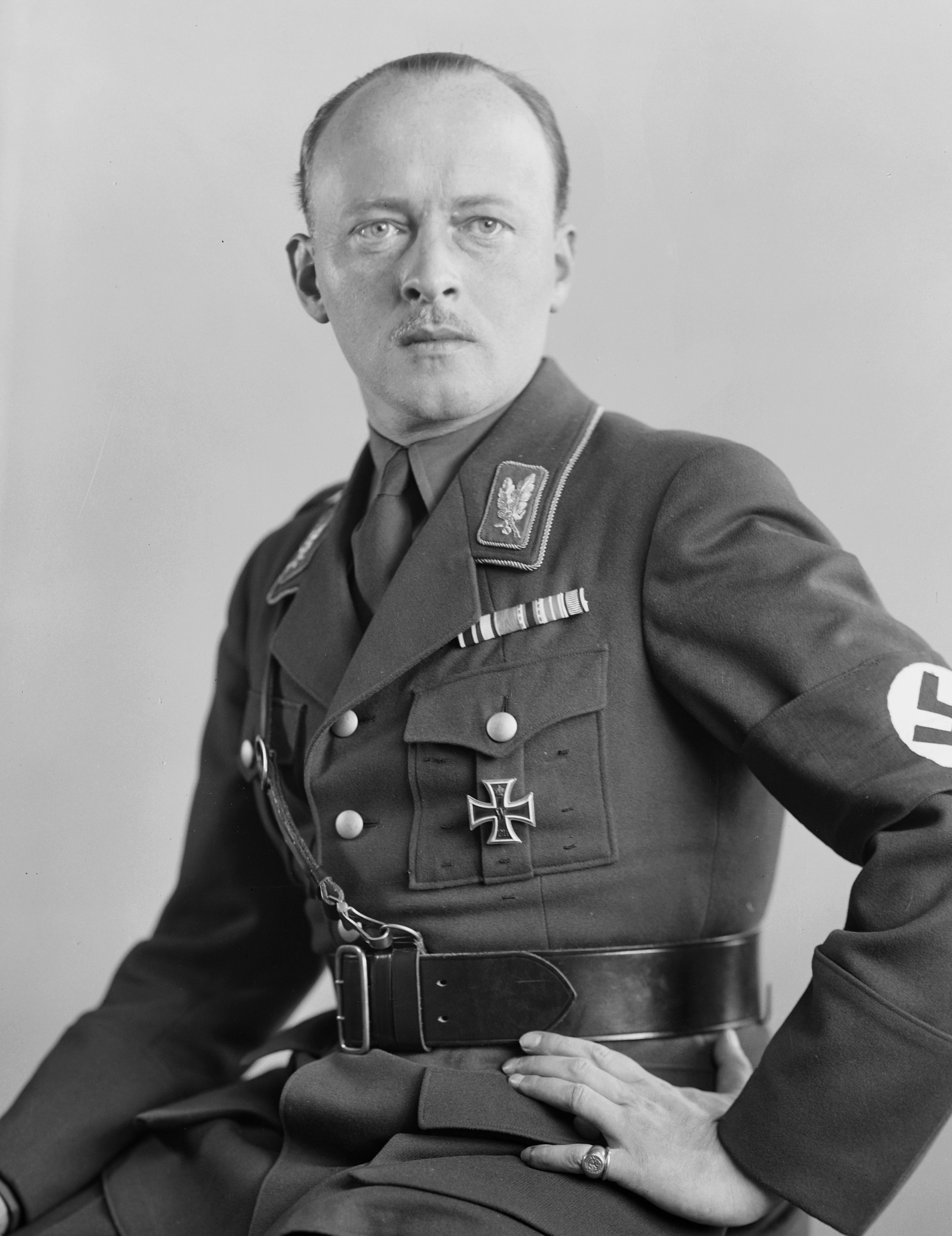
Prince Philipp of Hesse wearing his Sturmabteilung uniform

His relationship with Göring had deteriorated by 1939, with his relationship with Hitler deteriorating following Philipp's frank assessment of Italy and issues with Mussolini. Hitler summoned him to Berchtesgaden in April 1943, forcing Philipp to travel with him where he went, placing him under what was essentially house arrest. He was allowed to leave to visit his family during his son's operation in July that year, though was recalled urgently three days prior to the arrest of Mussolini. Hitler tried to use Philipp as a bargaining chip, formally arresting him on September 8, 1943. He was brought before Heinrich Müller, head of the Gestapo, where he was stripped of his party membership, his rank in the SA and an honorary commission with the Luftwaffe, after which he was imprisoned at Flossenbürg concentration camp until mid-April 1945; he was then transported frequently, first to Dachau, then to multiple camps to avoid his capture by the advancing Allied forces.

He was captured by British forces when Germany surrendered and transferred to Camp Ashcan, Luxembourg. He returned to Germany in August that year before being imprisoned in Darmstadt in 1946. Multiple charges were levied against him, though he was found guilty of none until his denazification trial the following December; after three days, the board placed him into Category II, the second highest of five categories. He appealed this from 1948–1949 and had his category reduced to Category III, which he appealed again the following year and again was reduced to category IV.

=== Schloss Friedrichshof and officer's club ===
The castle was built in the 19th century by Victoria, Princess Royal, daughter of Queen Victoria. She had modelled it after Balmoral Castle in Aberdeenshire, Scotland. Prior to the castle's occupation by American forces in 1945 and spurred on by the worsening bombardment of the Frankfurt area – where large portions of their valuables had been stored in various banks – the Hesse family decided to hide their most valuable possessions, including tiaras, necklaces and bracelets encrusted with valuable gems, gold cutlery, family bibles and snuff boxes, in Schloss Friedrichshof. In all, the valuables were estimated to be worth over $2.5 million at the time, or $36 million in 2021. (Note: This figure differs from historic sources, which claimed that the valuables were valued at $1.5 million. Modern sourcing is used here.) They were individually packaged and inventoried before being placed in a zinc-lined and waterproof wooden box. On the evening of October 31, 1944, the family's staff buried the box in the basement, covering the spot with cement and installing a false wall.

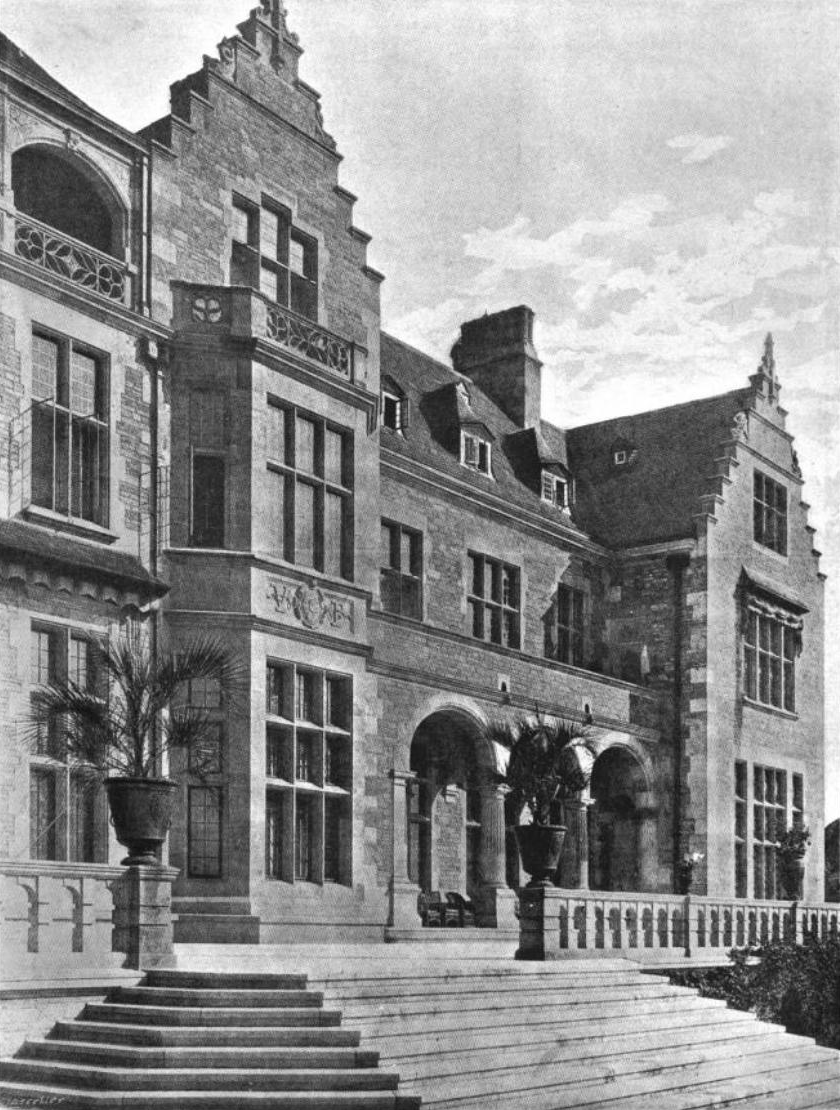
Schloss Friedrichshof, c. 1901

American forces arrived at Schloss Friedrichshof on March 29, 1945; elements of George S Patton's U.S. Third Army arrived in April and announced that the castle was to be requisitioned by American forces. It was to serve as one of 14 officers clubs in the Frankfurt area that Major Joseph Hartley was assigned to form. The residents, which included Philipp's mother and sister in law Sophia, were given four hours to pack and leave, with male family members being arrested. The rest were forced into cottages on the grounds. Upon realising the running of the castle would be too much for him to handle, Hartley assigned Women's Army Corps Captain Kathleen Nash to manage the mess section of the officer's club, ensure the safekeeping of the contents within the castle, and given the authority to use items within the house as required.

Within her first week, a painting and a sculpted marble hand disappeared. Nash informed authorities, with an investigation being launched by the Army's Criminal Investigation Division (CID). Several other objects disappeared during her time as well, with Nash reporting the thefts multiple times to CID. A check-in desk was set up at the castle, with a former servant of the house being placed at the door to spot attempted thieves; despite this, small items continued to disappear.

She eventually met Colonel Jack Durant, an Army Air Forces staff officer who had been assigned to Germany in August 1945 as executive officer to the deputy chief of staff of the Army Air Forces in Europe. Reportedly, they became quick friends, drinking heavily together. They were later joined by Major David Watson, who had previously served in Northern Ireland and France before becoming quartermaster officer under Durant and assigned to Supreme Headquarters Allied Expeditionary Forces (SHAEF).

=== British interest ===
While these events were ongoing, Margarethe's English relatives were becoming anxious that letters between the royal families and papers stored in Hessian castles could be revealed, including those that used Philipp as an intermediary between Adolf Hitler and the brother of King George VI, then Edward, Duke of Windsor, who would later become the British monarch for a brief period in 1936. In a biography of Stewart Menzies, then chief of MI6, authored by Anthony Cave Brown, these letters had "a basis of fact". According to historian John Costello, a military intelligence officer under SHAEF and assigned to Patton's command stated that he had discovered evidence of these letters between the Duke of Windsor and Hitler, which he stated he had found in a villa, then serving as an American officer's club, which was owned by a close relative of the Duke. Not long after, British authorities collected the letters. One of the officers sent to retrieve the letters was Major Anthony Blunt, seconded from MI5. He would later be revealed as a Soviet mole in the 1960s.

Blunt and Sir Owen Morshead, then the King's librarian, arrived at the castle in early May 1945 with a royal warrant from King George VI requesting the documents. Met by Nash, who was reportedly unimpressed by their credentials and likely unaware of the Hesse's ties to the Windsor's and other European nobles, initially refused their request to dine at the club as they had not booked ahead. After three days, the pair returned to England and headed to Windsor Castle with the documents. Prince Wolfgang of Hesse believed that this visit resulted in the Hesse's valuables being stolen, believing that Nash likely told Durant of the British delegation's visit to the castle and that Durant may have surmised that there may have been other valuables in the castle.

== Theft ==
The officer's club was successful by November 1945. Nash reportedly had heard a rumour from a castle bartender that treasure had been buried within the castle. The exact circumstances of how the box was discovered differs between sources, with one stating that Technician Fifth Grade Roy Carlton, one of Nash's staff, found two wires running into what appeared to be a solid foundation wall. Upon dismantling the wall with a sledgehammer, a secret room was revealed. Another pairing of accounts stated that a German had known of its location, with Nash permitting her assistant to search for the treasure, the result of which was the discovery of the false wall, which the assistant broke through. The three accounts similarly state that the room was searched, upon which time a fresh patch of concrete was found on the floor. It was dug up, revealing the box.

The accounts again differ as to how Nash became aware, though upon discovery of the box it was broken into, with Carlton later stating "It was quite a sight. We all sort of gaped, and we started pulling out the little packages and laying them right on the floor. Captain Nash got real excited. She told me to have the Germans take everything [to her room] and make sure none of the stuff 'wandered off'." In her room, she opened it and unpackaging the valuables. Nash later called Durant, who was at his desk with Watson. Not long into the conversation, Durant asked Watson to leave the room. When he hung up the call, he informed Watson he would be taking the afternoon off before speeding away on a jeep. An hour later, Durant called Watson, asking him to research the regulations on abandoned German property. Watson immediately contacted the US Forces, European Theatre (USFET) legal office, asking Lieutenant Colonel James Boyd what they should do if they found valuables previously owned by "some Nazi bigwig", to which he responded that "...it's pretty common practice for officers to appropriate some trophies as souvenirs."

Watson was initially kept out of the loop until November 8, where on that afternoon the three met in Nash's room in Schloss Friedrichshof. The contents of the box were spread on the floor, and it was initially agreed that they would only keep a few larger valuables, though they eventually agreed to keep them all. Knowing that they would be caught if they attempted to smuggle the goods to the US, they removed the jewels from their settings and set them aside. The three were assisted in their efforts to transport and sell the valuables by Carlton. Larger gems were sold on their own, while smaller ones were sold in batches. From November to December 1945, Watson travelled to Northern Ireland to sell large quantities of precious metals and gems, giving some to a girlfriend there, while in January the following year Nash and Durant sold gold and jewels in Swiss cities including Bern, Basel and Zurich. While in Switzerland, they reportedly sold a Faberge Egg for $400. Seemingly inconspicuous items were transported using the Army postal service, among these were; a sterling silver pitcher that Watson sent to his parents in California; a 36 piece solid gold table service and a large number of jewels that Nash sent to her sister's house; and valuables including jewels that Durant sent back to the US - the majority of which were sent to his brother in Virginia, who would later help to sell or bury many in jars across the state - via envelopes marked "Official" and by diplomatic bag. Approximately 30 boxes of valuables were sent to the US.

== Discovery and investigation ==
The day after the box was discovered, one of the house staff, Ludwig Weiss, reported the discovery to Heinrich Lange, manager of the estate, who informed Princess Margarethe of Hesse and by Rhine, mother in law of Princess Sophie. At her request on November 10, 1945, Lange asked for a statement from Nash acknowledging that the box had been found and formalising a date upon which the valuables would be returned; Nash refused, simply promising that the valuables would be there when the Hesses returned. Nash failed to document any of the Hesse's requests, with Lange being rebuffed upon each request, being told that the matter was being handled by Nash's superiors. In early January 1946, Princess Sophie was awaiting her second marriage, with Lange being asked to request that certain valuables be returned for the wedding. Nash declined several requests to meet and return the valuables. The Hesse family contacted the US Army office responsible for protecting German artifacts, requesting an investigation. When this was not forthcoming, Princess Sophie made a direct request to the CID in mid-April, convincing them to begin an investigation.

Nash was ordered to return to the US for terminal leave – the leave prior to discharge from the military – in February 1946 as her contract was ending and she was expecting an honorable discharge. Upon her return, and prior to her discharge, she was in California. By this time, Durant and Watson had smuggled the remaining pieces out of the country; days after Nash's departure, Durant travelled to London, England, meeting with his former secretary, Martha Evans, who was then working with the United Nations. She agreed to smuggle several valuables to the US. She inquired as to whether he was worried about getting into trouble, to which he responded "Get into trouble? I’m already up to my neck in it now."

Durant returned to the US on 30 days leave to Washington D.C. in March that year with more valuables and, as he was on courier's orders, he was able to avoid his baggage being searched. Following Durant's departure, Watson travelled again to Belfast, where he sold the last of the gold among other items. Durant continued to try to either hide or sell the valuables he had brought back, though he struggled to sell them without paperwork. Despite this, he was able to sell several large gems. By April, Watson had returned to Frankfurt.

CID opened an official inquiry into the case in late April, interviewing the majority of the Hesse family, all the employees at Schloss Friedrichshof and many American military and civilian personnel who had either worked or stayed there. Shipments from the three and Carlton were scrutinised, with investigators travelling to Switzerland and Northern Ireland to attempt to recover some of the valuables; though all of the valuables sold in Belfast were recovered, only some minor pieces were recovered in Switzerland due to their financial laws.

While tracking Watson was easy as he had remained in Frankfurt, Nash was in California awaiting her discharge, Carlton had already been discharged and was living in Texas while Durant had completed his duties in Washington and was on leave on the East Coast. CID in Germany looped in their counterparts in Washington to continue the investigation there.

Nash and Durant met in Chicago, Illinois, in March that year, attempting and failing to sell more gems after they were rebuffed by a jeweler as they lacked the requisite customs documents. The jeweler then informed the police, which reached CID. Durant was compelled to surrender 102 diamonds he failed to declare upon his return to the US, after which he forged paperwork claiming he was being discharged from the Army.

Nash's terminal leave was terminated on May 24, 1946. Two days later, while in Chicago, Durant and Nash dined while Nash wore a platinum watch encrusted with 606 diamonds that was formerly owned by Princess Mafalda of Savoy, wife of Prince Philipp; it was worth approximately $110,000 by 2021 estimates. At this dinner, they announced their intent to marry, which they did so two days later, knowing that if they were married they could not be compelled to testify against each other at a court martial. At the wedding, Kathleen wore some of the Hesse jewels. The pair travelled to Kathleen's sister's house in Wisconsin, where she received orders to report to Fort Sheridan, Illinois by May 29 or she would be tried as absent without leave. A few days later, Jack received orders that his leave had been terminated and that he was to report to Fort Sheridan. The two ignored the orders.

After Kathleen failed to report on May 29, Military Police were dispatched to her sister's home, arriving on June 2. By that time, Kathleen and Jack had already travelled to the La Salle Hotel, arriving that evening. They dropped off their bags in their room, got changed and left for the evening. Upon their return later that evening, they were arrested by CID. Jack was not taken into custody until the following morning.

Jack and Kathleen were interrogated extensively, including the use of polygraph testing, with Kathleen's being reportedly administered by one of its inventors, Leonard Keeler. After two hours of interrogation, she confessed to the thefts and implicated Jack and Carlton, though she later recanted her confession and refused to cooperate. A large quantity of valuables were recovered, with Jack contacting a man to whom he had sold over half the valuables he had smuggled; only a small amount were recovered. Jack later stopped cooperating.

In the weeks that followed, the Federal Bureau of Investigation became involved. Investigators interviewed their families and searched their homes, including that of Carlton. During a search of her sister's house in Hudson, Wisconsin, nine bound volumes of letters written between Princess Victoria and Queen Victoria were discovered among solid gold tableware and ornate bibles; these were not stored in the box hidden by the Hesse family and, if they had been stolen prior to the theft of the box, it would prove Prince Wolfgang's belief that the British delegation's visit likely triggered Kathleen and Jack to search for more valuables. On June 8, a locker in a railway station in Chicago was searched after Jack told authorities of its location, revealing a "glittering pile" of jewels. Following their charges for theft, Jack and Kathleen were transported to Frankfurt on June 17, where Watson had already been in custody for 10 days, to stand trial. Carlton avoided prosecution by agreeing to testify for the prosecution at trial.

== Trials ==
Kathleen Durant was charged with being absent without leave, larceny, fraud against the government, conduct unbecoming an officer and gentleman and bringing discredit upon the military service. Watson was charged with larceny, receiving stolen property and bringing discredit upon the military service.

Kathleen did not enter a plea. Her attorney offered two defenses during her month-long trial. First was that since she had been put on terminal leave, the Army had no jurisdiction over her. The second was that she had not stolen from the Hesse family, since they had abandoned the valuables and they were valid spoils of war. The trial included testimony from Princesses Sophie and Margarethe among other members of the Hesse family and Heinrich Lange. The list of items attributed to Kathleen was almost four pages long, with the items being displayed in the court as evidence. The court found her guilty on all charges, sentencing her to five years imprisonment and hard labor.

Watson's trial was far shorter, lasting two weeks, in which his attorney claimed that Watson did not aim to steal anything, citing the rampant looting of dead Nazis and Schutzstaffel members by Allied forces. While the panel of 10 colonels did not find him guilty of larceny as he did not personally steal any valuables, he was convicted on all other charges and sentenced to three years imprisonment and hard labor. Jack Durant's trial lasted from December 1946 until April 1947, with multiple people being called to testify; Kathleen was called in but refused to testify, while Jack's brother, sister-in-law and an ex-girlfriend were called to testify, refusing to testify as they would have to fly to Germany and could not be compelled to do so. Proceedings were then moved to Washington, D.C. to compel the three to testify. Though his ex-girlfriend cooperated, his sister-in-law and brother refused to do so, responding "I decline to answer" for every question. Jewelers from cities in the US and Europe testified against Jack, with items attributed to him also being displayed at his trial alongside photos of the princesses wearing valuables that Kathleen and Jack had taken apart. He was found guilty of all eight charges levied against him, including theft, smuggling and forging the signature of another officer to expedite his discharge. As he was considered the ringleader, he was sentenced to 15 years imprisonment and hard labor.

== Aftermath ==
=== Post-sentencing ===
All three served their sentences began at Fort Leavenworth, Kansas, US, beginning their appeals not long after their imprisonment. Some time between her imprisonment and her appeal, Kathleen was moved to a prison in Alderson, West Virginia. Kathleen was successful in her appeal, again arguing that the Army had no jurisdiction over her, with a district court agreeing to overturn her conviction on September 4, 1947. The government appealed and the original sentence was upheld, after which she returned to Leavenworth in 1948 to see out the rest of her sentence. Watson aimed to gain clemency, collecting 275 letters in support of his case. He was paroled in 1947, after which he attempted to gain a presidential pardon, which was granted by President Dwight D. Eisenhower in 1957. Jack's appeals were unsuccessful and he remained imprisoned, being moved to a prison in Atlanta, Georgia, at some point between his imprisonment and 2 August 1951. He was released in 1952, though at some time during his imprisonment he and Kathleen divorced. Following the end of their sentences they remarried, remaining married until their deaths; Kathleen died in 1983, while Jack died a year later.

=== Return of valuables ===
A few days after the three were arrested, between $600,000 and $1 million (Note: $9,924,953.85 or $16,541,589.74 as of 2025) in valuables recovered from the thefts were displayed at The Pentagon. Over half the jewels and the majority of the gold and silver are included in this figure.

Despite multiple pleas from the Hesse family, the Army did not return the valuables they had recovered until August 1, 1951, at which point the search for the valuables had cost US $100,000. (Note: $1,240,619.23 as of 2025) Brigadier General Claude Mickelwait, assistant Judge Advocate General, ceremoniously transferred to the Hesse family "jewels filling 22 cubic foot Army safes and consisting of more than 270 items [including] a platinum bracelet encrusted with 405 diamonds; a platinum watch and bracelet with 606 diamonds; a sapphire weighing 116.20 carats; a group of diamonds weighing 282.77 carats; and a gold bracelet with 27 diamonds, 54 rubies and 67 emeralds." As so many of the gems had been removed from their settings, those that were recovered depreciated to a tenth of their previous value, while those that were not will likely never be recovered.

Schloss Friedrichshof was not returned to the Hesse family until 1953, after which they turned it into a hotel.
