= Jonathan Marsden (art historian) =

Sir Jonathan Mark Marsden, KCVO, FSA (born 1960) is an art historian, curator and courtier.

Marsden was a curator with the National Trust before joining the Royal Collection, one of the five departments in the Royal Household, in 1996. He was Deputy Surveyor of The Queen's Works of Art, responsible for curating decorative arts, until he succeeded Sir Hugh Roberts to become Surveyor of the Queen's Works of Art and Director of the Royal Collection on 1 May 2010. As Director of the Royal Collection, Marsden chaired the Royal Collection Management Committee. He resigned in December 2017.

He was a trustee of the Art Fund, the City and Guilds of London Art School, the Georgian Group, Historic Royal Palaces, the Royal Yacht Britannia Trust, and the Household Cavalry Museum Trust. He was the honorary editorial secretary of the Furniture History Society from 2005 to 2011, and editor of Furniture History from 2006 to 2011.

He is a trustee of English Heritage and a commissioner at Historic England.

Marsden was appointed a Lieutenant of the Royal Victorian Order (LVO) in the 2003 Birthday Honours and was promoted to Commander (CVO) in the 2013 New Year Honours. On his retirement, he was appointed a Knight Commander of the Royal Victorian Order (KCVO) on 19 December 2017.
