= Francis Watson (art historian) =

British art historian

Sir Francis John Bagott Watson, KCVO FBA (24 August 1907 – 27 September 1992) was a British art historian.

== Education ==
Watson was educated at Shrewsbury and St John's College, Cambridge.

== Career ==
In 1934, Watson began working for the Courtauld Institute of Art under James Mann. He followed Mann to the Wallace Collection, and took over the position of Director at Mann's death, serving from 1963 to 1974. He was also Surveyor of the Queen's Works of Art from 1963 to 1972.

Watson was Slade Professor of Fine Art at the University of Oxford, 1969–70.
