= Royal Librarian (United Kingdom) =

Coordinates: 51.4841°N 0.6018°W

The office of Royal Librarian, in the Royal Collection Department of the Royal Household of the Sovereign of the United Kingdom, is responsible for the care and maintenance of the books and manuscripts in the Royal Library, a collection spread across all the palaces, occupied and unoccupied. In addition to their role overseeing the librarians in the Royal Library, the Librarian is also Deputy Keeper of the Royal Archives and is responsible for the management of the Royal Archives and its collections.

== The role of the Royal Librarian ==
Today the Royal Library collections comprise the documentary and intellectual heritage of the Monarchy of the United Kingdom and its predecessors, span nearly two-and-half millennia and comprise millions of pages, many unique, many encapsulating some of the most extraordinary moments in British history, and many items important in their own right. As well as books and manuscripts, The Librarian is also responsible for the collections of insignia, coins and medals, seals, banknotes, and other material. As Assistant Keeper of the Royal Archives, The Librarian has oversight of the Royal Archives, based at Windsor Castle since 1911. The Royal Library and Royal Archives supports the work of the Royal Household in the Royal Collection Trust Department through exhibitions, events, and publications, and the work of the Lord Chamberlain's and Private Secretary's Offices through the creation of displays and manufacture of gifts for State Visits, for selected garden parties, and other types of official and public engagement. The Royal Library and Royal Archives teams work very closely with the information assurance work of Royal Household to meet the challenges of dealing with library and archive material in the digital age. The Royal Library includes responsibility for the Royal Library bindery.

== History ==
Although a Librarian was always required for any sizeable royal collection of books, the present office dates from 1836, when the then existing collections of books at Windsor Castle were consolidated. This followed two donations of the bulk of the historic collections to the British Museum (now held in the split-off British Library). The so-called Old Royal Library was given under George II in 1757, and included the relatively small, but high quality, holdings of medieval manuscripts, many acquired or re-acquired long after their creation, and a collection essentially beginning with Edward IV that had been retained since new in the royal library. The King's Library was some 65,000 volumes essentially assembled by George III and given by George IV. The offer was made in 1823, but the physical transfer delayed until 1827, when a new gallery had been built.

The office was only admitted to the Royal Household in the 19th century. John Glover was appointed in 1837 and since his time there have been 8 subsequent Librarians. They are:

- John Glover 1837-1860
- Bernard Woodward 1860-1869
- Richard Holmes 1870-1905
- John Fortescue 1905-1926
- Owen Morshead 1926-1958
- Robin Mackworth-Young 1958-1985
- Oliver Everett 1985-2002
- Jane Roberts 2002-2013
- Oliver Urquhart Irvine 2014-2018
- Stella Panayotova 2019-

Up to and including the tenure of Oliver Everett, the Librarians were responsible for all the collections within the Royal Library at Windsor Castle, including the prints and drawings collections, and since the establishment of the Royal Archives in the Round Tower at Windsor Castle in 1911, the Librarian has also been responsible for the day-to-day management of the Royal Archives answering to the Keeper of the Royal Archives, a post held by the Sovereign's Private Secretary. From 2002 to 2013 the then Librarian, Lady Jane Roberts's responsibilities included the Library and prints and drawings only, with the Assistant Keepership of the Royal Archives coming under the responsibility of Director of Records (currently David Ryan first as Assistant Keeper and now as Deputy Keeper of the Royal Archives). Since 2014, The Librarian has once again responsibility as Assistant Keeper of the Royal Archives, while the prints and drawings collections held in the Print Room became the responsibility of a newly created post of Head of Prints and Drawings (currently Martin Clayton).

The current Librarian and Deputy Keeper is Stella Panayotova, formerly of the Fitzwilliam Museum.
