= Portrait of George III (Beechey) =

Painting by William Beechey

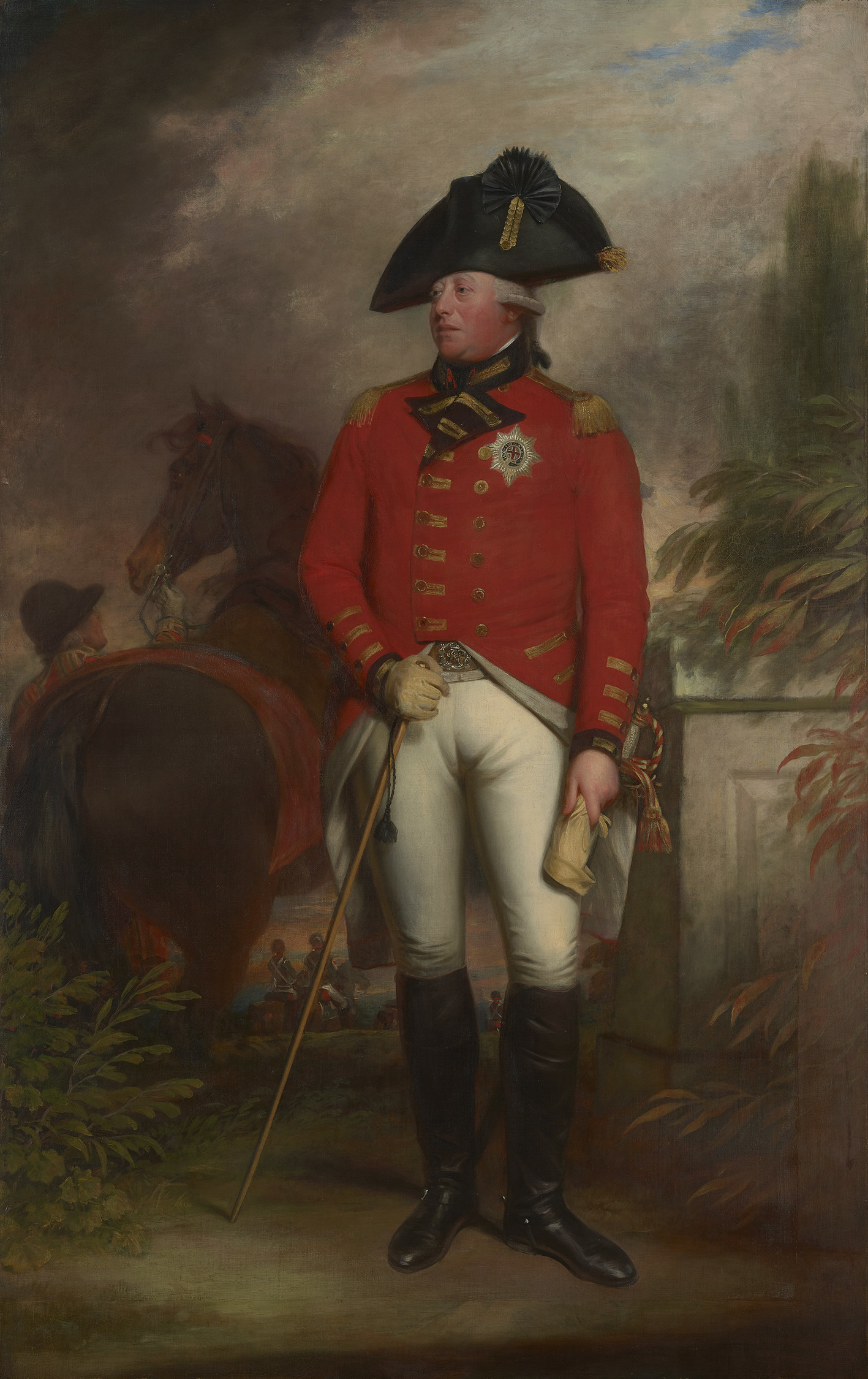
- Original version in the Royal Collection at Buckingham Palace
- Artist: William Beechey
- Year: 1799–1800
- Type: Oil on canvas, portrait painting
- Dimensions: 254 cm × 159.4 cm (100 in × 62.8 in)
- Location: Buckingham Palace; London

The Portrait of George III is a portrait painting of c. 1800 by the British artist William Beechey depicting the reigning monarch George III.

The work was commissioned by the King and was painted at Windsor. He was depicted wearing the uniform of general of the British Army with the Order of the Garter and a black cockade on his bicorne hat representing the Electorate of Hanover. Several versions of the painting exist, with varying backgrounds. While the original in the Royal Collection has the King standing in front of his charger by a groom, the version in the National Maritime Museum in Greenwich shows Windsor Castle behind him. Another version is in the National Portrait Gallery.

Beechey secured many royal commissions. He stood for election as President of the Royal Academy in 1830 but lost out to his fellow portraitist Martin Archer Shee. The painting was shown at the Royal Academy's Summer Exhibition of 1800 at Somerset House. George hung the painting at his summer residence Kew Palace. It was later moved to the Principal Staircase at Buckingham Palace, where it remains today.

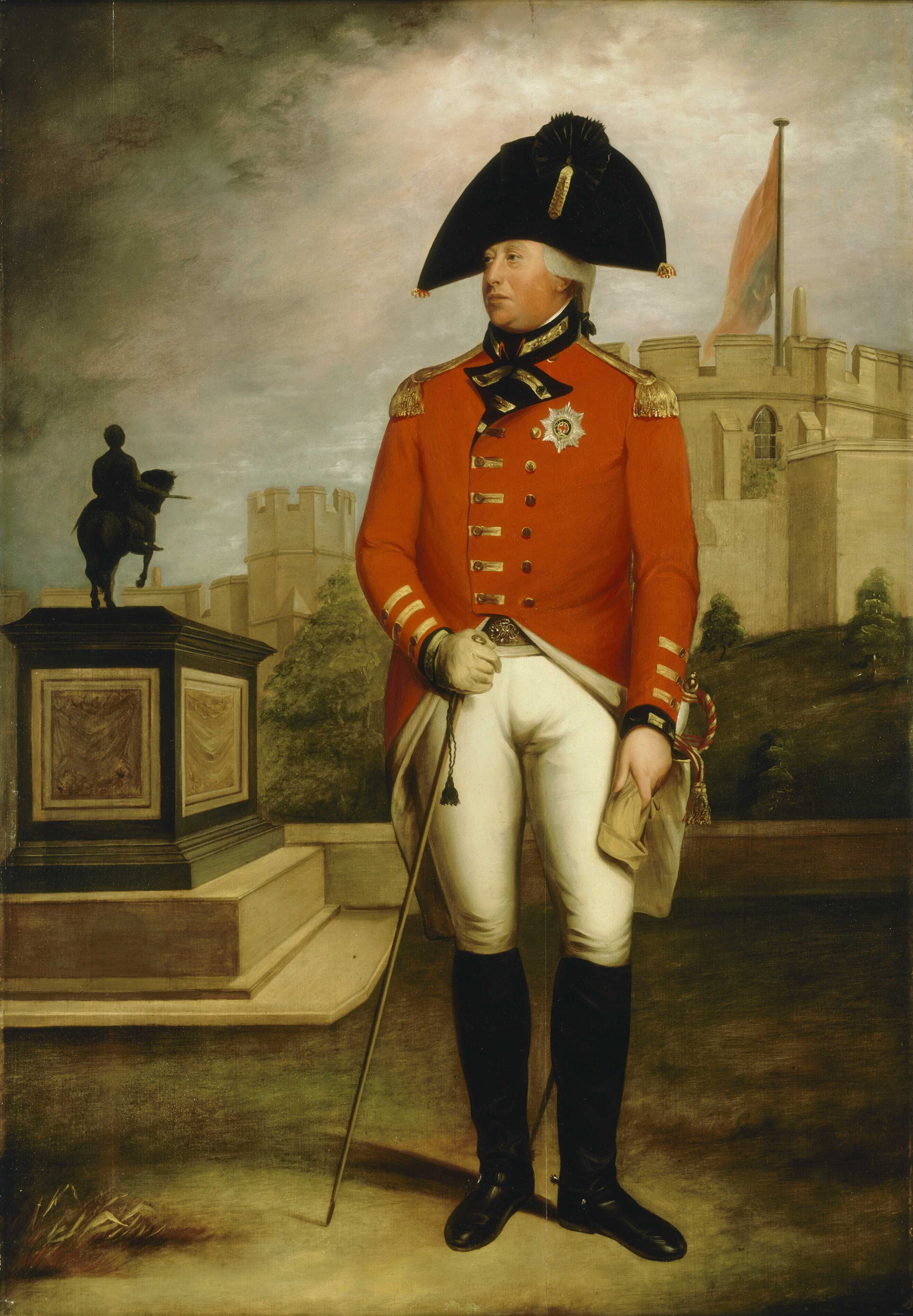
Version in the National Maritime Museum, with Windsor Castle in the background

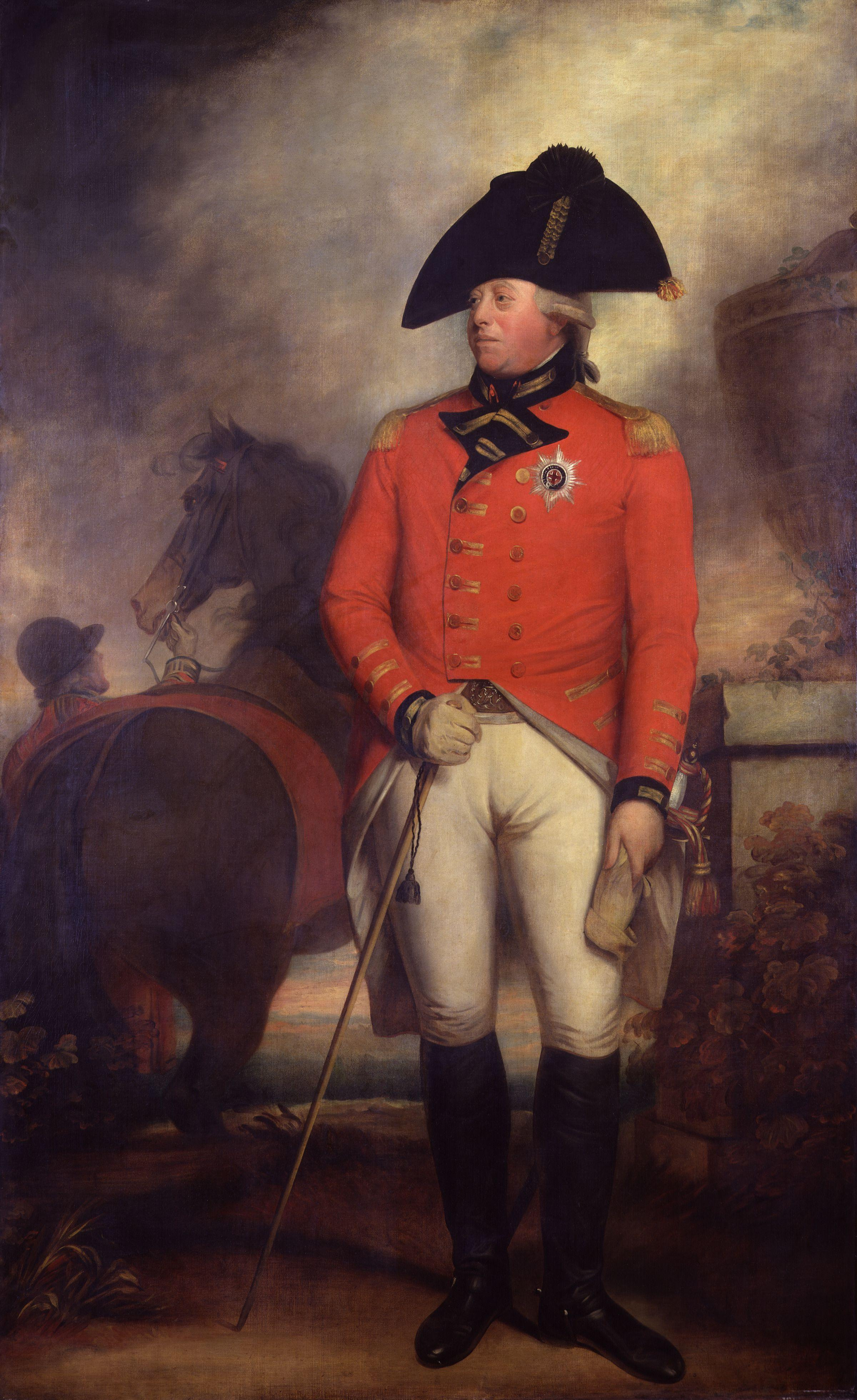
Copy of the original version, in the National Portrait Gallery

== See also ==
- George III and the Prince of Wales Reviewing Troops, painting of 1798 by Beechey

== Bibliography ==
- Levey, Michael. Sir Thomas Lawrence. Yale University Press, 2005.
- Robinson, Leonard. William Etty: The Life and Art. McFarland, 2007.
- Roberts, William. Sir William Beechey, R.A.. Duckworth and Company, 1907.
