= Martin Clayton =

British art historian

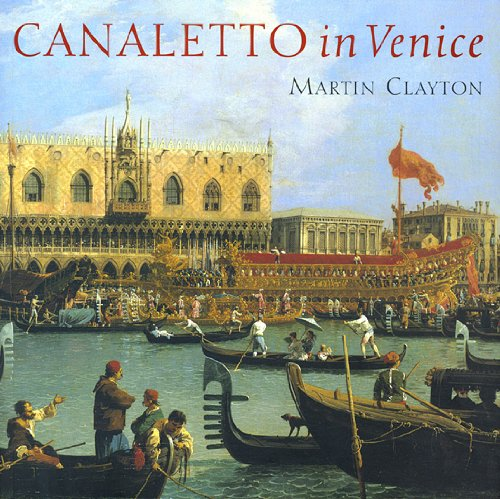
The cover of Canaletto in Venice (2005)

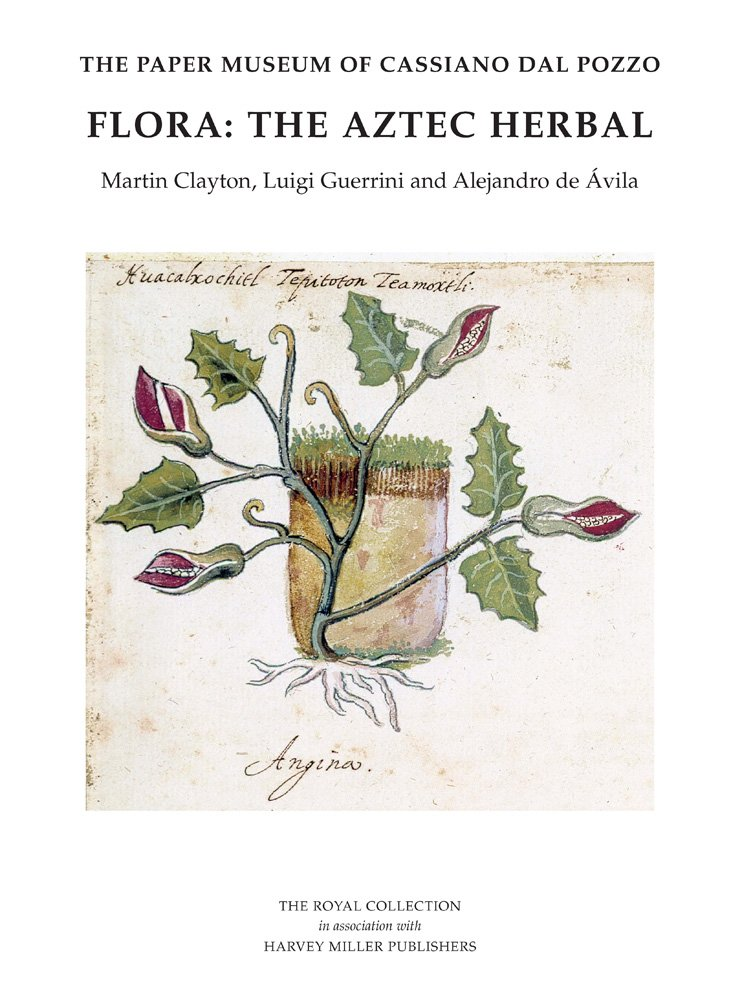
Cover of the Aztec Herbal volume of the catalogue raisonné of Cassiano dal Pozzo's Paper Museum

Martin Clayton, LVO, FSA, (born 1967) is Head of Prints and Drawings for Royal Collection Trust at Windsor Castle. He is a specialist in the drawings of Leonardo da Vinci.

== Early life ==
Martin Clayton was born in Harrogate, North Yorkshire on 30 December 1967 to David and Brenda Clayton. He was educated at King James's School, Knaresborough, and from 1986 to 1990 at Christ's College, University of Cambridge, where he studied Natural Sciences and History of Art, graduating with a first. He credits his interest in art to a school trip to the Hermitage Museum in St Petersburg where he was fascinated by the chisel marks on a sculpture there.

== Career ==
After graduating, Clayton began to work in the Print Room of the Royal Library, Windsor Castle, as Assistant Curator, subsequently becoming Deputy Curator, Senior Curator, and (in 2013, on the retirement of Jane Roberts) Head of Prints and Drawings. He has curated many exhibitions in the UK and internationally based on material in the royal collection and written the corresponding catalogues. He is a specialist in the drawings of Leonardo da Vinci.

Clayton is the editor of the natural history volumes of the catalogue raisonné of the Paper Museum of Cassiano dal Pozzo, the major part of which is held in the Royal Library at Windsor. He also co-wrote the volume on Cassiano's Aztec Herbal with Luigi Guerrini and Alejandro de Ávila.

== Honours ==
Clayton was made a Lieutenant of the Royal Victorian Order (LVO) in the 2015 New Year's honours list.

== Selected publications ==
- Leonardo da Vinci: The Anatomy of Man. Bulfinch Press, 1992 (with Ron Philo)
- Poussin: Works on Paper. Drawings from the Royal Library, Windsor Castle. Merrell Holberton, London, 1995. ISBN 978-1-85894-019-9
- Leonardo da Vinci: A Curious Vision. Drawings from the Royal Library, Windsor Castle. Merrell Holberton, London, 1996. ISBN 978-1-85894-028-1
- Raphael and his circle: Drawings from Windsor Castle. Royal Collection, 1999.
- Leonardo da Vinci: The Divine and the Grotesque. Royal Collection, 2002.
- Holbein to Hockney: Drawings from the Royal Collection. Royal Collection, 2004. ISBN 978-1902163642
- Canaletto in Venice. Royal Collection, 2005. ISBN 978-1902163819
- The Art of Italy in the Royal Collection: Renaissance and Baroque. Royal Collection, 2007. (With Lucy Whitaker) ISBN 978-1902163291
- The Paper Museum of Cassiano dal Pozzo. Flora: The Aztec Herbal. 2009. (With Luigi Guerrini and Alejandro de Ávila) ISBN 978-1-905375-30-1
- Leonardo da Vinci. The Mechanics of Man. Royal Collection Trust, 2010 (with Ron Philo)
- Leonardo da Vinci. Anatomist. Royal Collection Trust, 2012 (with Ron Philo)
- Castiglione: Lost Genius. Royal Collection Trust, 2013. (With Timothy J. Standring) ISBN 978-1-905686-77-3
