= George III and the Prince of Wales Reviewing Troops =

Oil on canvas painting by William Beechey

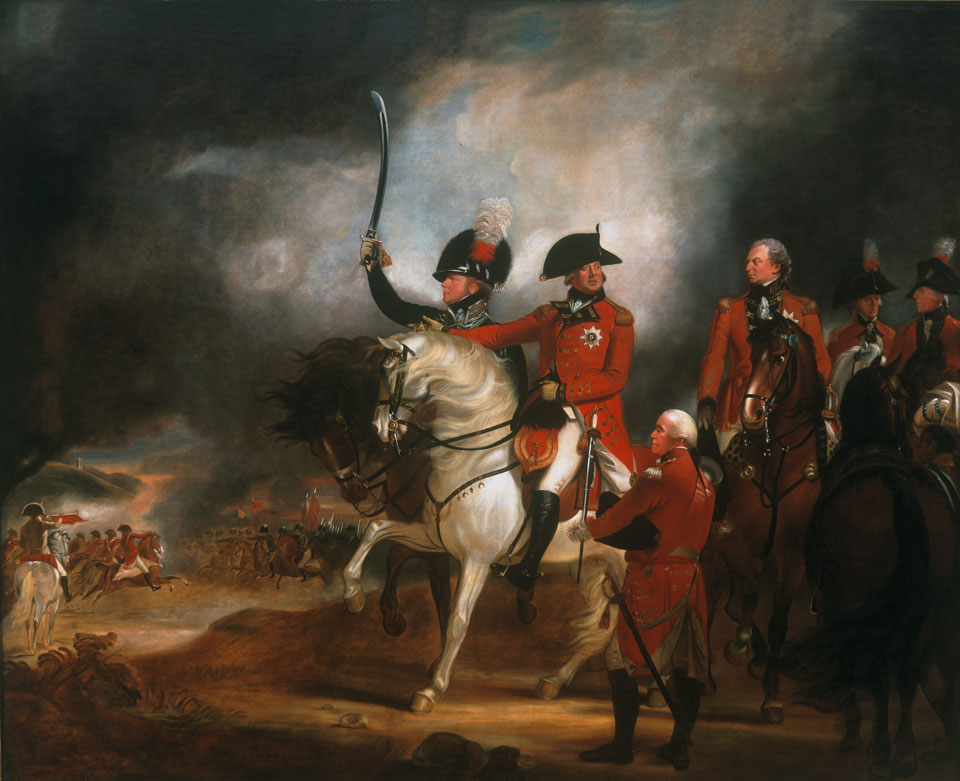
The National Army Museum version.

George III and the Prince of Wales Reviewing Troops was an oil on canvas painting by William Beechey, showing George III and his sons George, Prince of Wales and Frederick, Duke of York at an imagined review in Hyde Park. George rides Adonis (his favourite horse), whilst the Prince of Wales wears the uniform of the 10th Light Dragoons, of which he was colonel. Beside Frederick is David Dundas (Quartermaster General, who had commanded manoeuvres at Windsor and Weymouth before the king) and the painting also shows Philip Goldsworthy (one of the king's equerries and aides-de-camp) and William Fawcett, the 3rd Dragoon Guards' Colonel.

The painting was commissioned by George III and exhibited at the Royal Academy exhibition in 1798. The preliminary sketches do not include the Prince of Wales – though he later sat to Beechey for the work, some versions of it survive without him. The original was hanging in State Dining Room at Windsor Castle at the time of the 1992 fire and – too large to move out – it was the only painting to be destroyed. (Its place is now filled by the similarly sized 1751 group portrait of George III, his mother, brothers and sisters by George Knapton.)

A smaller version survives in the collection of the National Army Museum, probably copied around 1830 by Beechey's son George Duncan Beechey. Another version is kept at the Clark Art Institute.

== See also ==
- Portrait of George III, an 1800 painting by Beechey
