= Geoffrey de Bellaigue =

French-British art historian

Sir Geoffrey de Bellaigue GCVO FBA FSA (12 March 1931 – 4 January 2013) was Surveyor of the Queen's Works of Art from 1972 to 1996. His was the first full-time appointment to the office, and he did much to professionalise the Royal Collection department after being made the Director of the Royal Collection in 1988.

De Bellaigue was born in 1931, son of Viscount Pierre de Bellaigue and Marie-Antoinette Willemin. His mother taught French and French literature to the Princesses Elizabeth and Margaret. He was educated at Wellington College, and Trinity College, Cambridge, where he obtained a BA in 1954 (and MA in 1959). He also attended the École du Louvre (Paris) and was a follower of Pierre Verlet. From 1954–59, de Bellaigue worked for J Henry Schroeder and Co., and later joined the National Trust and worked for them at Waddesdon Manor 1960-63, where he was Keeper of Collection 1962-1963.

He joined the Royal Household in 1963, as Deputy Surveyor of the Queen's Works of Art. In 1972 he was promoted to Surveyor of the Queen's Works of Art, and from 1996 was Surveyor Emeritus. He held the positions of Surveyor of the Queen's Works of Art and Director of the Royal Collection concurrently from 1988–96.

== Affiliations/Honours ==
Geoffrey de Bellaigue was a member of the Executive Committee of the National Art Collections Fund from 1977, Honorary President of the French Porcelain Society from 1985, and a trustee of the Wallace Collection from 1998. He was appointed a Member of the Royal Victorian Order (MVO) in 1968, and was advanced to Commander (CVO) in 1976. He was knighted as a Knight Commander (KCVO) in 1986. His retirement in 1996 saw him advanced to Knight Grand Cross (GCVO), which is the highest grade within the Royal Victorian Order. He was elected a Fellow of the British Academy in 1992, and was also a Fellow of the Society of Antiquaries of London.

== Death ==
De Bellaigue died in 2013, aged 81, from undisclosed causes. He was survived by his wife, two daughters, and his twin brother.

== Publications ==
During his appointment as Surveyor of the Queen's Works of Art he wrote many of the catalogues for exhibitions at the Queen's Gallery either alone or in collaboration with Sir Oliver Millar and others. He also succeeded Anthony Blunt as general editor of the scholarly catalogues of the James A. De Rothschild Collection at Waddesdon Manor. He published many articles on the decorative arts in The Burlington Magazine, Apollo, The Journal of the Furniture History Society, and elsewhere.

Books:

- Furniture, Clocks and Gilt Bronzes: The James A. De Rothschild Collection at Waddesdon Manor (Two volumes), Office du Livre, 1974.
- Preferences in French Furniture, Wallace Collection Monographs 2, Trustees of the Wallace Collection, London, 1979.
- The Sevres Porcelain in the Collection of Her Majesty the Queen: The Louis XVI Service, Cambridge University Press, 1986.
- French Porcelain in the Collection of Her Majesty the Queen (Three volumes), Royal Collection Trust, 2009.

In collaboration:

- (with John Harris and Oliver Millar, intro: John Russell), Buckingham Palace, Thomas Nelson, 1968.
- (with Svend Eriksen), Sèvres Porcelain: Vincennes and Sèvres, 1740-1800 (The Faber monographs on pottery & porcelain), 1987.

The Furniture History Society published a Festschrift in his honour: Makers, Dealers and Collectors: Studies in Honour of Geoffrey De Bellaigue (edited by Jonathan Marsden), 2007.
