= Surveyor of the King's Works of Art =

Department of the Royal Household of the Sovereign of the United Kingdom

The office of Surveyor of the King's/Queen's Works of Art in the Royal Collection Department of the Royal Household of the Sovereign of the United Kingdom is responsible for the care and maintenance of the royal collection of works of art owned by the Sovereign in an official capacity, about 700,000 objects - many of museum quality. The collection is spread across the various official and historic residences. Those objects in the official residences are in constant use. Objects in the Royal Collection are distinct from those objects owned privately and displayed at Sandringham House and Balmoral Castle and elsewhere. The Surveyor oversaw conservation of works of art: there are three conservation workshops, including a recently constructed workshop in the Home Park, Windsor.

The office dates from 1928, and has only been full-time since 1972. Sir Lionel Cust, Surveyor of the King's Pictures, had been responsible for works of art from 1901 to 1927. The current Surveyor is Caroline de Guitaut, who was appointed in December 2023. She is the first woman to hold the position. The previous Surveyor, Rufus Bird, was appointed upon the retirement of Jonathan Marsden, who was in turn appointed upon the retirement of Sir Hugh Roberts on 20 April 2010. Jonathan Marsden was the last Surveyor who was also concurrently Director of the Royal Collection for which he chaired a management committee of the Surveyors and Librarian and other administrators.

The post of Surveyor of the King's Works of Art was in abeyance until December 3, 2023.

== List of Surveyors of the King's/Queen's Works of Art ==
- Sir Lionel Cust 1901–1927 (also Pictures)
- Sir Cecil Harcourt-Smith 1928–1936
- Lieutenant-Colonel Lord Gerald Wellesley 1936–1943
- Sir James Mann 1946–1962
- Sir Francis J.B. Watson 1963–1972
- Sir Geoffrey de Bellaigue 1972–1996
- Sir Hugh Roberts 1996–2010
- Sir Jonathan Marsden 2010–2017
- Rufus Bird 2017–2020
- Caroline de Guitaut 2023–
