= Owen Morshead =

British Army officer and librarian

Sir Owen Morshead
- Born: 28 September 1893; Tavistock, Devon
- Died: 1 June 1977 (aged 83); Sturminster Newton, Dorset
- Military career
- Allegiance: United Kingdom
- Branch: British Army
- Service years: 1915–1919
- Rank: Major
- Unit: Royal Engineers
- Commands: 9th Battalion, Berkshire Home Guard
- Conflicts: First World War; Second World War
- Awards: Knight Grand Cross of the Royal Victorian Order; Knight Grand Cross of the Order of the Bath; Distinguished Service Order; Military Cross; Mentioned in Despatches (5); Legion of Honour (France); War Merit Cross (Italy)

Sir Owen Frederick Morshead, GCVO, KCB, DSO, MC (28 September 1893 – 1 June 1977) was a British Army officer and librarian, who served as Royal Librarian from 1926 to 1958.

== Early life ==
Morshead was born in Tavistock, Devon, the son of Reginald Morshead and Ella Mary Morshead. He was educated at Marlborough College and then, initially intending to pursue a career in the Royal Engineers, at the Royal Military Academy, Woolwich. In 1913 he relinquished his cadetship and entered Magdalene College, Cambridge.

== Career ==
Morshead's studies were interrupted by the outbreak of the First World War, in which he saw active service on the Western Front and Italian Front as a commissioned officer in the Royal Engineers. During the war he was awarded the Military Cross, invested as a Companion of the Distinguished Service Order, awarded the Italian War Merit Cross and was Mentioned in Despatches five times. He subsequently returned to Cambridge where he read Modern Languages. Upon graduating he became librarian of the Pepys Library.

In 1926 he became Royal Librarian at Windsor Castle and served in the position until 1958. During the Second World War he commanded the 9th Battalion, Berkshire Home Guard and from 1946 to 1958 was a Deputy Lord Lieutenant of Berkshire. Morshead was appointed a Member of the Royal Victorian Order (MVO) in 1933, a Commander (CVO) in 1937, a Knight Commander (KCVO) in 1944, and a Knight Grand Cross (GCVO) upon his retirement in 1958. He was made a Knight Commander of the Order of the Bath (KCB) in 1953. George VI sent Morshead, accompanied by Anthony Blunt, then working part-time in the Royal Library as well as for British intelligence, to Friedrichshof in March 1945 to secure papers relating to the German Empress Victoria, the eldest child of Queen Victoria. Looters had stolen part of the castle's archive, including surviving letters between daughter and mother, as well as other valuables, some of which were recovered in Chicago after the war. The papers rescued by Morshead and Blunt, and those returned by the American authorities from Chicago, were deposited in the Royal Archives. From 1958 to 1971 he was given the honorary title of Emeritus Librarian by Elizabeth II.

== Personal life ==
Morshead married Paquita, daughter J.G. Hagemeyer, of Florence, Italy in 1926. They had one son and two daughters. Morshead was the founder and chairman of the Dorset Historic Churches Trust. He was a close personal friend of George V and Queen Mary.
