= Oliver Everett =

British diplomat and academic (1943–2023)

Oliver William Everett, CVO (28 February 1943 – 22 December 2023) was a British diplomat and sportsman, who served as a private secretary to the then Prince Charles and then Diana, Princess of Wales. He was then the Royal Librarian from 1985 to 2002.

== Life and career ==
Everett was educated at St Aubyn's School in Woodford Green, Essex (having been Captain of the 1st XV), Felsted School, the Western Reserve Academy in Hudson, Ohio, and at Christ's College, Cambridge, where he read natural sciences and history. He subsequently studied for a master's degree in international relations at The Fletcher School of Law and Diplomacy, and did post-graduate work in international relations at the London School of Economics.

Everett joined the Foreign and Commonwealth Office in 1967 and was 1st Secretary in New Delhi 1969 to 1973. Subsequent service in the Diplomatic Service included a posting as Head of Chancery in Madrid 1980 to 1981.

He was a lifelong sportsman and was especially interested and active in baseball and polo. He founded the Windsor Bears Baseball Club and was co-founder of the World Elephant Polo Association.

From 1978 to 1980 he was seconded as Assistant Private Secretary to the Prince of Wales. After leaving the Diplomatic Service in 1981 he served as Private Secretary to the Princess of Wales from 1981 to 1983, and as Librarian, Royal Library, from 1985 to 2002 (he was deputy librarian, 1984–1985). He was a NADFAS lecturer, and Librarian Emeritus, Windsor Castle.

Everett died on 22 December 2023, at the age of 80.
