= Jane Roberts (librarian) =

British librarian (1949–2021)

The Honourable Dame Jane Roberts
- Born: Priscilla Jane Stephanie Low; 4 September 1949
- Died: 29 June 2021 (aged 71)
- Education: Westfield College; Courtauld Institute of Art
- Occupation: Librarian
- Known for: Curator of the Print Room at Windsor Castle
- Spouse: Hugh Roberts (m. 1975)

Dame Priscilla Jane Stephanie, Lady Roberts, DCVO, FSA (née Low; 4 September 1949 – 29 June 2021), known as simply Jane Roberts, was the Curator of the Print Room at Windsor Castle from 1975 and the Royal Librarian from 2002 until her retirement in July 2013.

== Background and education ==
Priscilla Jane Stephanie Low was the eldest daughter of Brigadier Toby Low, 1st Baron Aldington and his wife Araminta née MacMichael. She was educated at Cranborne Chase School, Westfield College (now part of Queen Mary, University of London), and the Courtauld Institute of Art.

== Honours ==
Roberts was appointed a Member of the Royal Victorian Order (MVO) in 1984. She was subsequently promoted to Lieutenant (LVO) in 1995, Commander (CVO) in 2004, and to Dame Commander (DCVO) of the same Order in 2013.

== Personal life ==
On 13 December 1975, Jane Low married Sir Hugh Roberts, who was the Director of the Royal Collection and Surveyor of the Queen's Works of Art until April 2010.

She and her husband lived at Adelaide Cottage, a grace and favour home near Frogmore House in Home Park, Windsor. The couple had two daughters: Sophie Jane Cecilia Roberts (born 28 March 1978) and Amelia Frances Albinia Roberts (born 1982).

She died on 29 June 2021, at the age of 71.

== Works ==
- 1979: Holbein. Oresko Books ISBN 0-905368-62-2
- 1985: Exhibition Catalogues Master Drawings in the Royal Collection
- 1987: Royal Artists. Grafton ISBN 0-246-13015-6
- 1989: Leonardo Da Vinci
- 1993: A King's Purchase
- 1993: Holbein and the Court of Henry VIII
- 1995: Views of Windsor: watercolours by Thomas and Paul Sandby
- 1997: Royal Landscape
- 1999: The King's Head: Charles I, King and Martyr
- 1999: Ten Religious Masterpieces from the Royal Collection: a Millennium celebration
- 2002: Royal Treasures (editor)
- 2004: George III and Queen Charlotte (editor)
- 2005: Unfolding Pictures: fans in the Royal Collection
- 2006: Queen Elizabeth II: a birthday souvenir album
- 2007: Five Gold Rings: a royal wedding souvenir album
- 2008: Charles, Prince of Wales: a birthday souvenir album
