= Print Room, Windsor =

Coordinates: 51.4833°N 0.6031°W

The Print Room at Windsor Castle is a print room which is an office in the Royal Collection Department of the Royal Household of the Sovereign of the United Kingdom. It is responsible for the care and maintenance of the royal collections of drawings and old master prints, including watercolours. The term refers to both an institution and a room, and is under the direction of the Head of Prints and Drawings, currently Martin Clayton.

The collection is exceptionally strong, with famous holdings of drawings by Leonardo da Vinci (550), Raphael, Michelangelo and Hans Holbein the Younger (85). A large part of the Old Master drawings were acquired by George III.

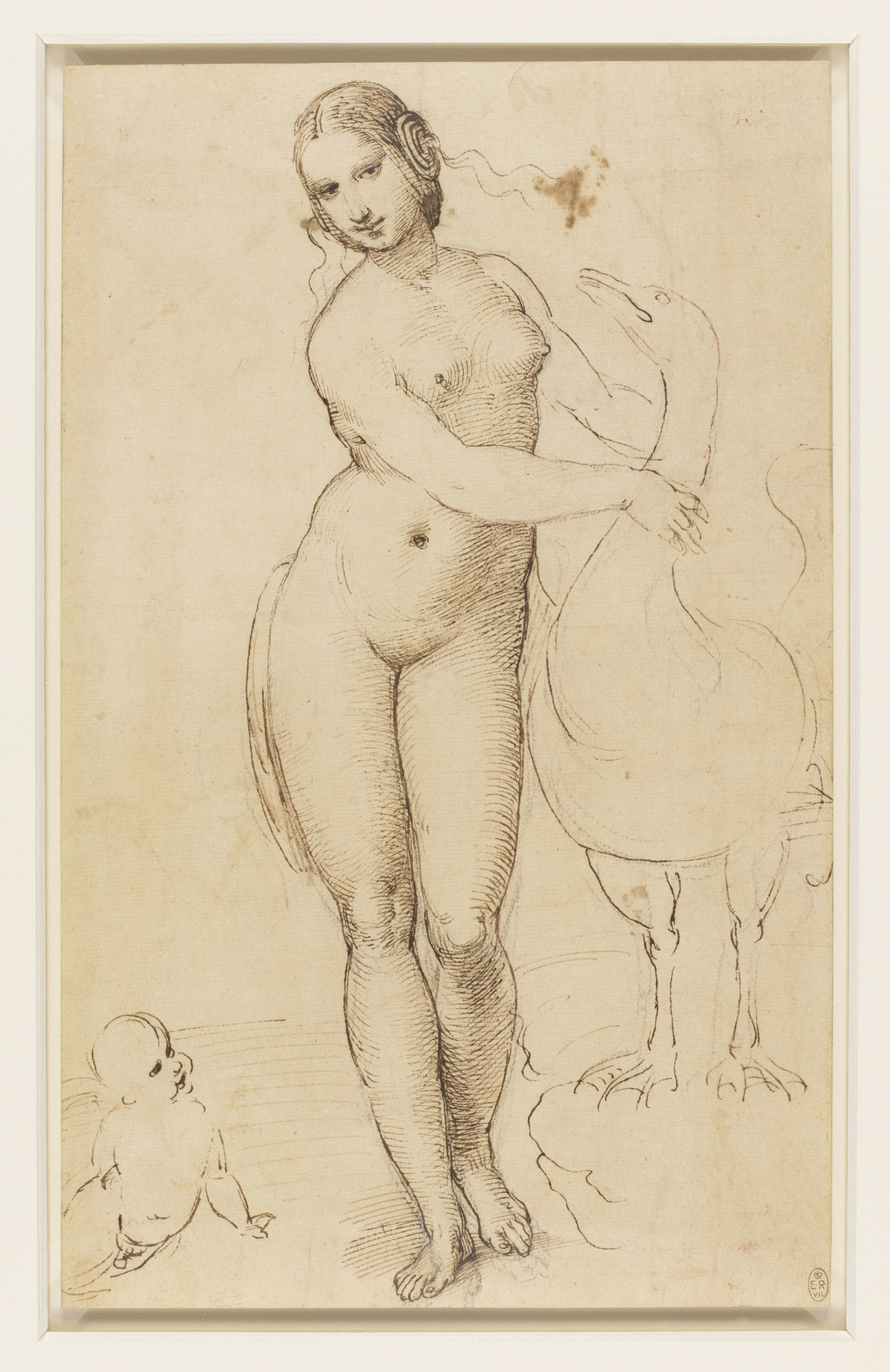
Raphael, Leda and the Swan, c.1507

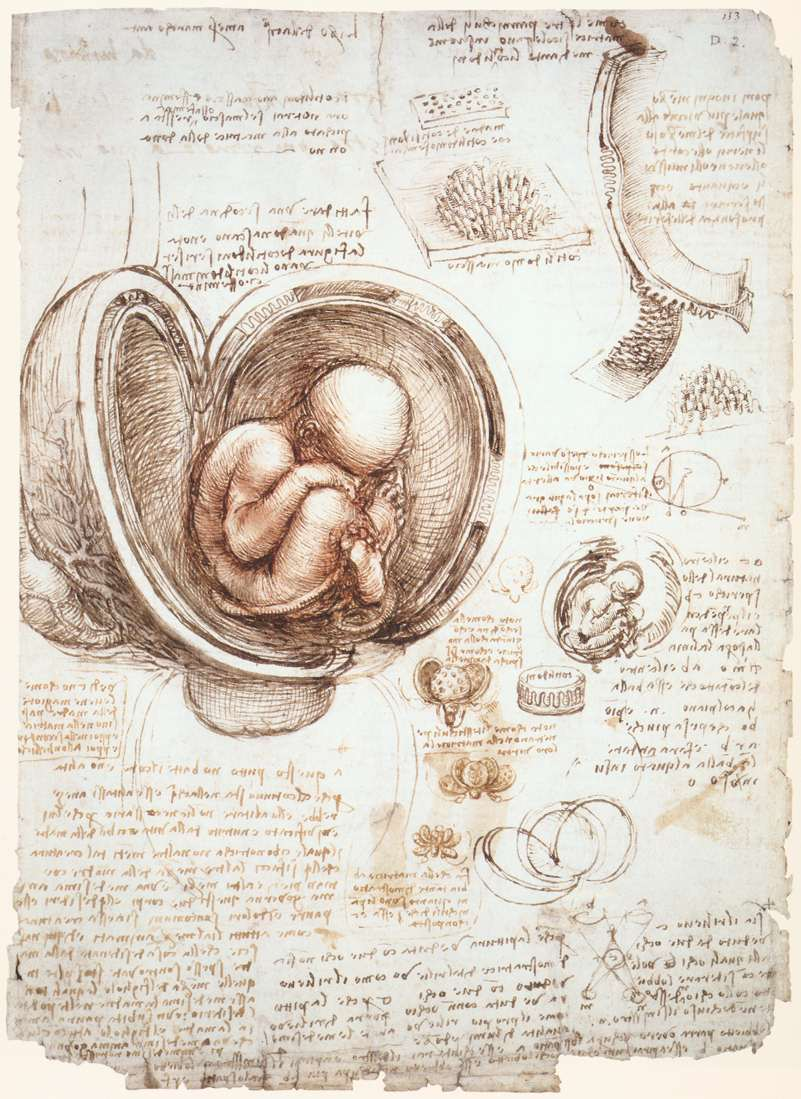
Leonardo da Vinci – Studies of the Fetus in the Womb, 1511

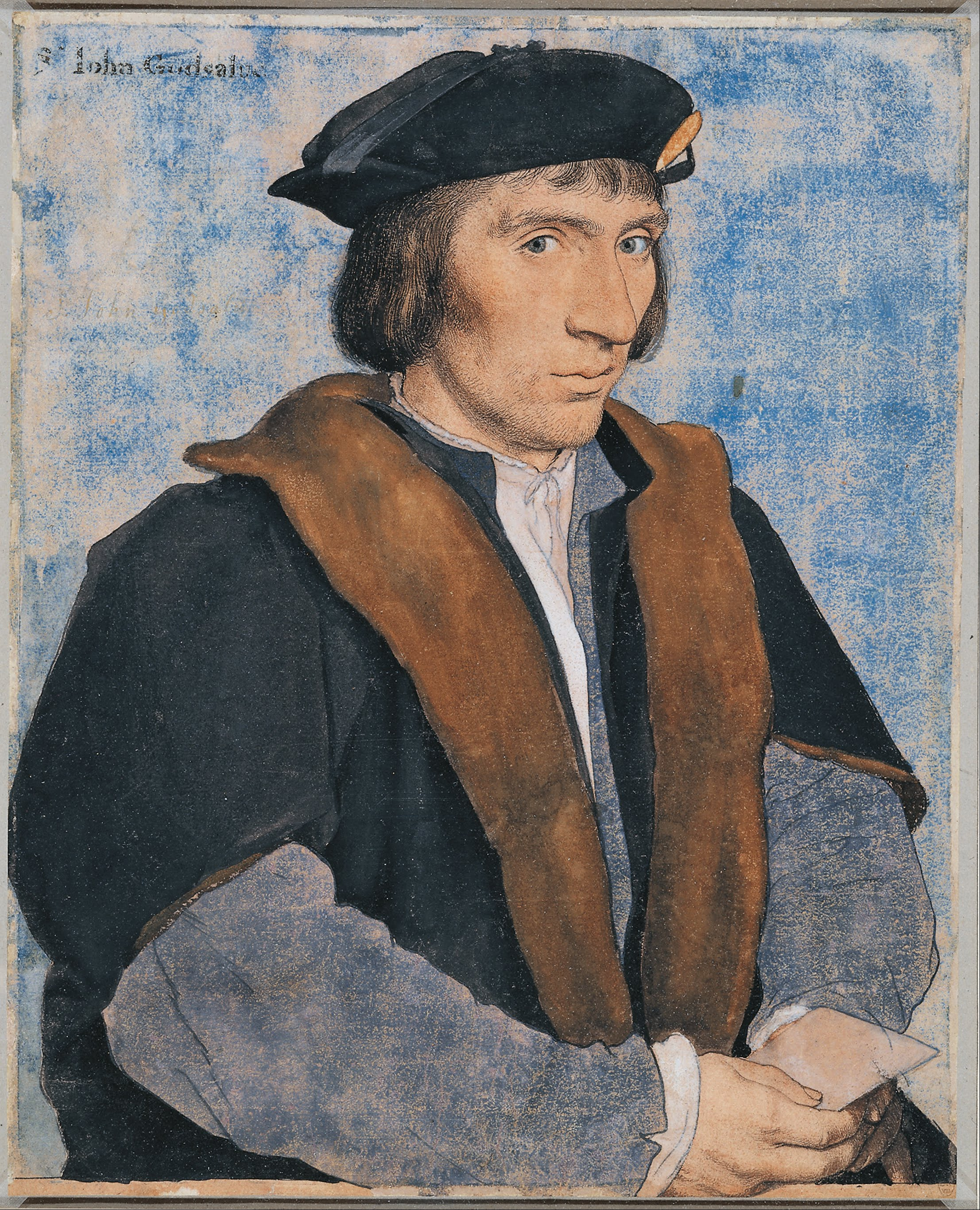
Hans Holbein the Younger, Sir John Godsalve (c.1505-56), 1532–34, drawing with chalks and bodycolour

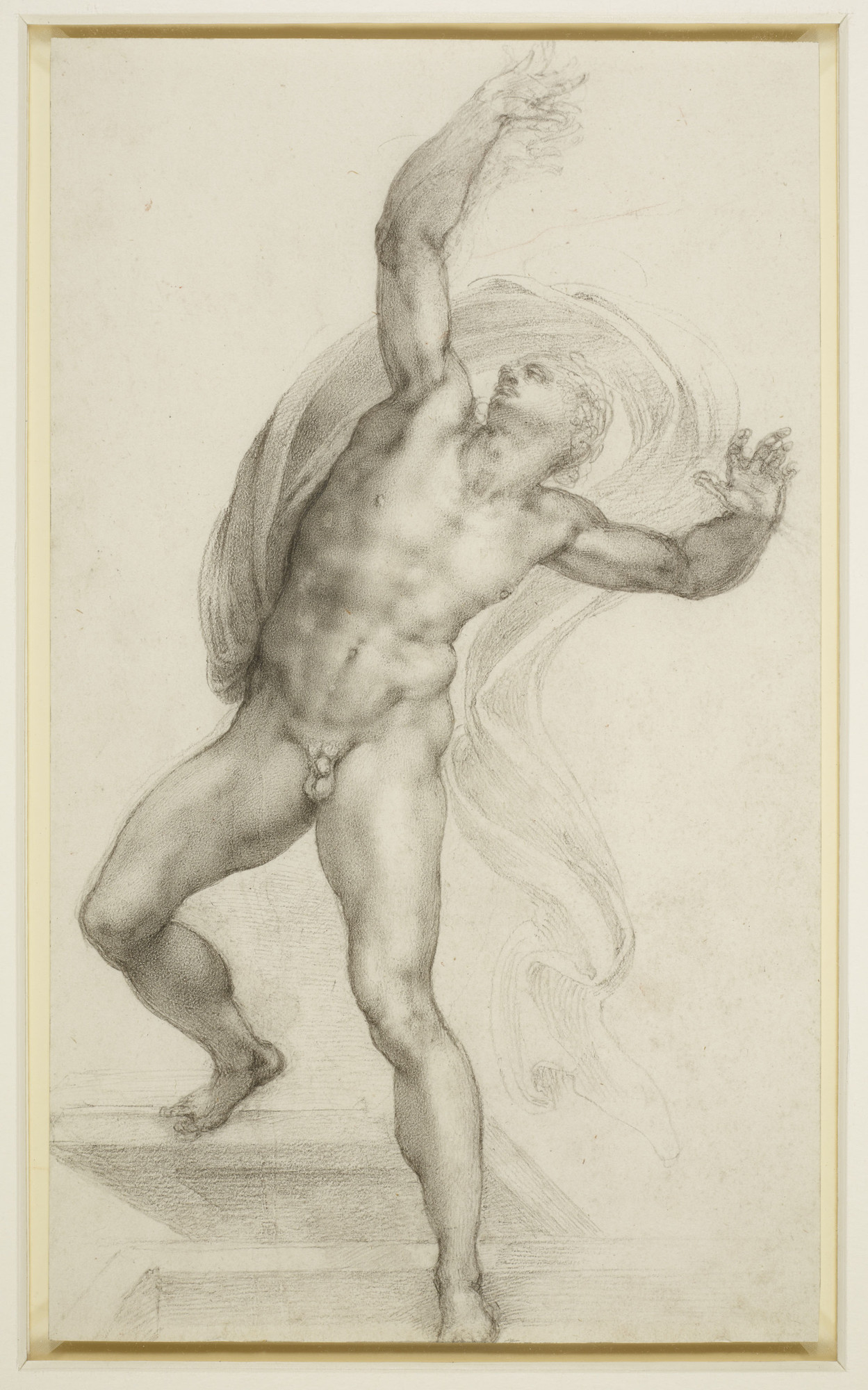
Michelangelo, The Risen Christ, c.1532

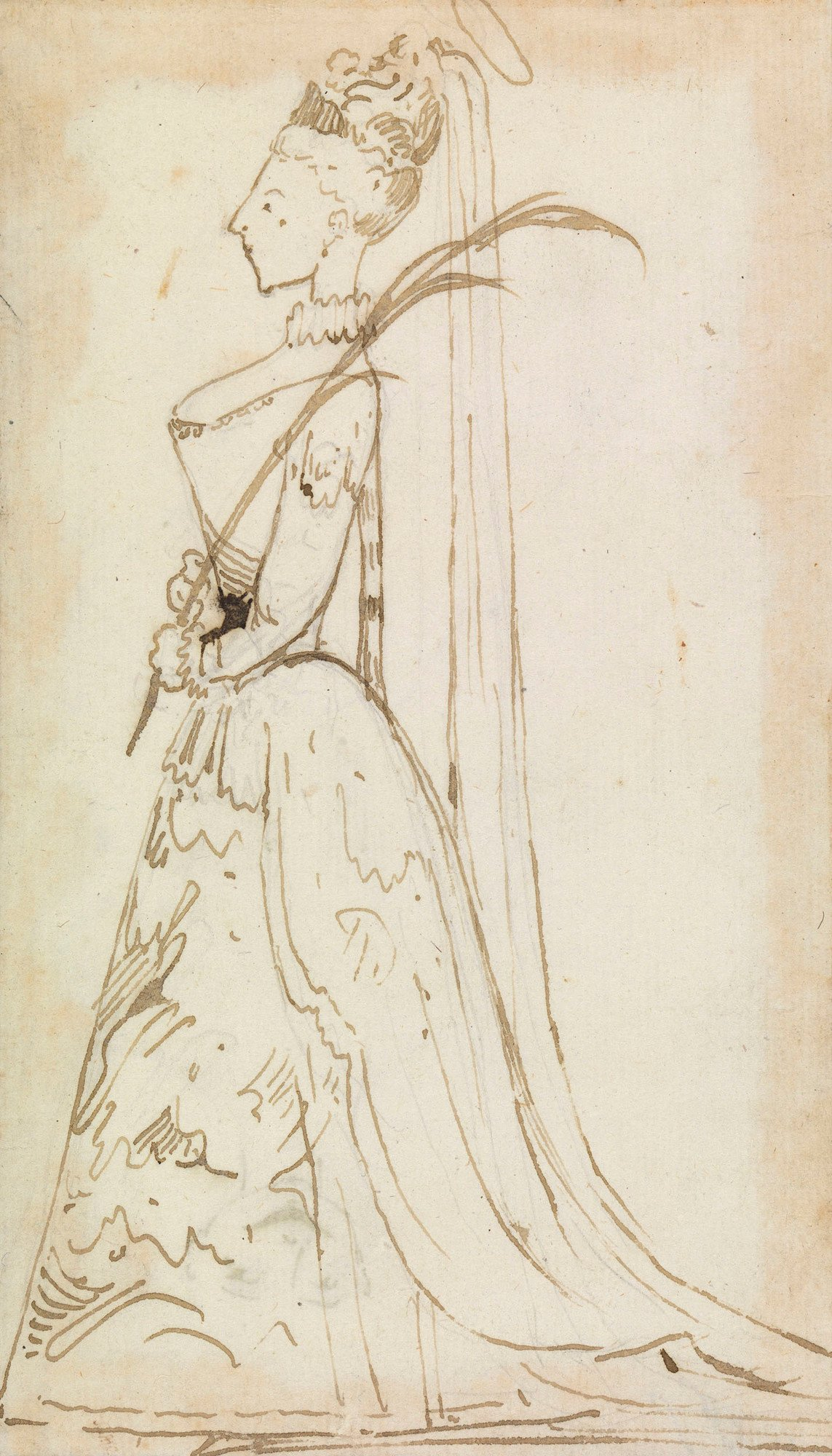
Marco Ricci, Caricature of opera singer Maria Giustina Turcotti, c. 1720-1730
