= Hugh Roberts (art historian) =

British art historian and curator

Sir Hugh Roberts GCVO FSA
- Born: Hugh Ashley Roberts; 20 April 1948 (age 78); Portsmouth, England
- Occupations: Art historian and curator
- Spouse: Jane, Lady Roberts
- Children: 2

Sir Hugh Ashley Roberts GCVO FSA (born 20 April 1948) is a British art historian and curator.

He was the Director of the Royal Collection, the art collection of the British royal family, and Surveyor of the Queen's Works of Art, whose office is responsible for the care and maintenance of the royal collection of works of art owned by the Sovereign of the United Kingdom in an official capacity.

Roberts was closely involved in the restoration of Windsor Castle, a medieval castle and royal residence located in Windsor, Berkshire, England, notable for its long association with the British Royal Family and its architecture after its 1992 fire.

== Career ==
He was previously a director of Christie's, an art-business and a fine-arts auction house, and was the head of its Decorative Arts Department. His particular area of expertise is French and English furniture and interior decoration of the 18th and 19th centuries; he has written extensively on these subjects in Royal Collection exhibition catalogues and major journals.

On 20 April 2010, on his retirement as Director of the Royal Collection, Roberts was appointed a Knight Grand Cross of the Royal Victorian Order and Surveyor Emeritus of The Queen's Works of Art

== Personal life ==
Roberts graduated from Corpus Christi College, Cambridge in 1970. On 13 December 1975, Roberts married The Hon. Jane Stephanie Low (later Dame Jane, Lady Roberts, DCVO), a daughter of the 1st Baron Aldington; they have two daughters.

== Bibliography ==
- Roberts, Hugh (2001). For The King's Pleasure – The Furnishing and Decoration of George IV's Apartments at Windsor Castle. London: Royal Collection Trust. ISBN 9781902163048. (alternate ISBN 978-0-500-97610-4)
- Roberts, Hugh (2012). The Queen's Diamonds. London: Royal Collection Trust. ISBN 9781905686384.

== See also ==
- List of historians
