= Michael Parke-Taylor =

Canadian art historian, curator (born 1953)

- Born: Michael Geoffrey Parke-Taylor; August 5, 1953; Toronto, Ontario
- Education: Honours Bachelor’s degree in art history at the University of Toronto (1976) and Master’s Degree in art history from the Courtauld Institute of Art, University of London (1979)
- Known for: art historian of modern art, author of books on Lionel LeMoine FitzGerald and Bertram Brooker, curator
- Spouse: Barbara Butts (m. 1998)

Michael Parke-Taylor (born August 5, 1953) is an independent art historian and curator who worked at the Art Gallery of Ontario in Toronto in various positions for twenty-three years, retiring as Curator of Modern Art in 2011. He has published widely and is a collector of popular culture. In 2024, he curated the retrospective exhibition and wrote the accompanying book for the exhibition Bertram Brooker: When We Awake! at the McMichael Canadian Art Collection in Kleinburg. He lives in Toronto.

== Career ==
Parke-Taylor was born in Toronto. He completed his Honours Bachelor’s degree in art history at the University of Toronto (1976) and Master’s Degree in art history at the Courtauld Institute of Art, University of London (1979). From 1980 to 1985, Parke-Taylor was Curator of Exhibitions at the MacKenzie Art Gallery in Regina. In this position, he curated Prints by Rodolphe Bresdin which travelled to the Montreal Museum of Fine Arts, André Derain in North American Collections (which travelled to the University Art Museum, University of California at Berkeley and was praised for its beautiful selection on a shoestring budget by Newsweek magazine), and Jacques Lipchitz: Mother and Child. He also curated numerous exhibitions on prairie artists such as Bob Boyer, Edward Poitras, Bob Christie, Douglas Haynes, Ann Clarke, Gary Olson, and Brian Fisher.

From 1986 to 1987, he was Curator of the Toronto Board of Education Archives, then from 1987 to 2011, Parke-Taylor held various curatorial positions at the Art Gallery of Ontario (AGO), retiring in 2011 as Curator of Modern Art. He was responsible for European modernist painting, sculpture, and works on paper from 1900 to 1960, including the AGO's extensive holdings of Henry Moore. He organized the exhibitions Picasso at Large in Toronto Collections, The Symbolist Prints of Edvard Munch: The Vivian and David Campbell Collection (with Elizabeth Prelinger), Humanity Refigured: Henry Moore and Postwar British Sculpture, André Masson inside/outside Surrealism: Prints and Illustrated Books from the Gotlieb Collection, and Voyage into Myth: French Painting from Gauguin to Matisse from the Hermitage Museum, Russia (with Nathalie Bondil).

Following his retirement from the Art Gallery of Ontario in 2011, Parke-Taylor published extensively on Lionel LeMoine FitzGerald, writing both books and articles about him. In 2019, he co-curated with Sarah Milroy and Ian Dejardin, Into the Light: Lionel LeMoine FitzGerald (McMichael Canadian Art Collection in Kleinburg) and in 2024, he curated the retrospective exhibition and wrote the catalogue for Bertram Brooker: When We Awake! at the McMichael.

Parke-Taylor has published on aspects of the 1960s San Francisco psychedelic rock posters and in 2008 donated an extensive collection of street gig posters from Toronto to Library and Archives Canada (R12541-0-7-E). In 2011, Parke-Taylor curated the exhibition PIN UP at Mercer Union in Toronto which featured posters by contemporary Canadian artists and an installation of Toronto gig posters from Parke-Taylor’s private collection. He has written articles for the Journal of Popular Culture about psychedelic posters and catalogue entries on the new Western frontier in art and film. Parke-Taylor's extensive MAD magazine and related archive was donated to York University Archives in Toronto in 2024. He describes himself as something of an addict where collecting is concerned.

== Writing ==
Parke-Taylor organized, co-organized or contributed essays to exhibitions on a wide range of art and artists, contributing to the art writing on such artists as Edmund Morris (1984), Robert Longo (1986), Edvard Munch (1997), and Modigliani (2004), and has curated exhibitions on a broad range of subjects in the field of prints and drawings. He is author of the e-book: "Lionel LeMoine FitzGerald: Life and Work" (Art Canada Institute, 2019) which was selected by the Art Canada Institute to appear as a hardcover printed book. With Nathalie Bondil, Kenneth Silver, and Albert Kostenevich, he co-curated the monumental exhibition Voyage into Myth: French Painting from Gauguin to Matisse from the Hermitage Museum, Russia (2009). His books "In Seclusion with Nature: The Later Work of L. LeMoine FitzGerald 1942–1956", "Some Magnetic Force: Lionel LeMoine FitzGerald Writings" (2023) and "Bertram Brooker: When We Awake" (2024) are important contributions to Canadian art history. "Some Magnetic Force" is said to provide "remarkable insights into the influences, interests, and innovations" of the Group of Seven's prairie artist.
