= Bertram Brooker =

Canadian abstract painter (1888–1955)

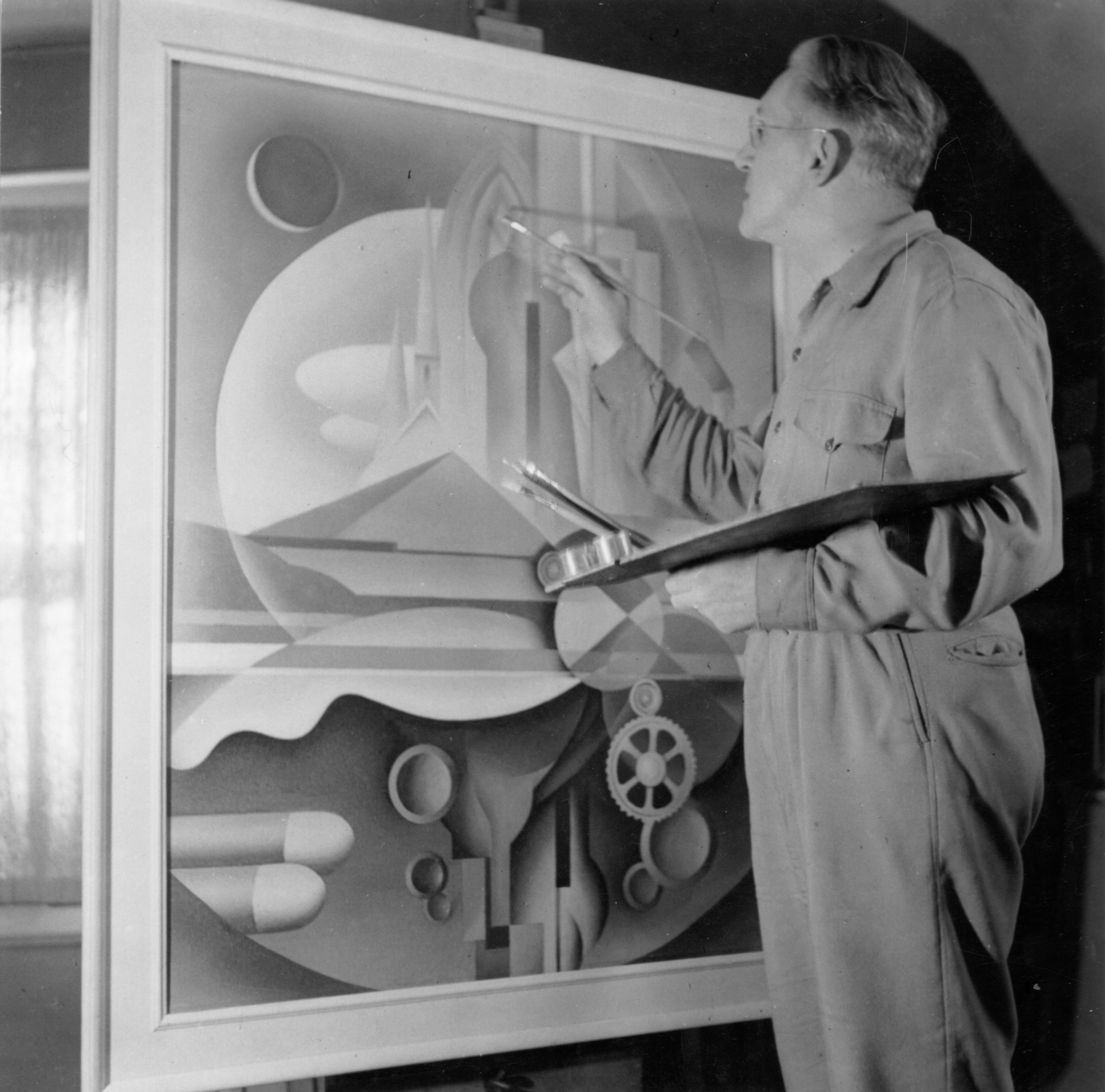
- Brooker painting in his studio, 1943
- Born: Bertram Richard Brooker; 31 March 1888; Croydon, England
- Died: March 21, 1955 (aged 66); Toronto, Ontario, Canada
- Known for: Writer, Painter, Musician
- Movement: Abstraction
- Spouse: Mary Aurilla ("Rill") Porter (m. 1913)
- Awards: Governor General's 1936 Award for Fiction

Bertram Richard Brooker (March 31, 1888 – March 21, 1955) was a Canadian abstract painter. A self-taught polymath (the first in Canadian art), in addition to being a visual artist, Brooker was a Governor General's Award-winning novelist, as well as a poet, screenwriter, playwright, essayist, copywriter, graphic designer, and advertising executive. A key part of the art community in Toronto, he is considered one of its "most gifted first responders".

== Early life ==
Brooker was born in Croydon, England, to Richard Brooker and Mary Ann (Skinner) Brooker. In 1905, when he was seventeen, he moved to Portage la Prairie, Manitoba along with his family. There was a booming economy and a huge influx of emigrants from England and elsewhere in Europe wanting to better their lives. In Portage la Prairie, Brooker worked with his father at the Grand Trunk Pacific Railway in a menial capacity. He attended night school and was, as a result, given clerical work at the railway.

== Career ==
After moving to Neepawa, a small town northeast of Brandon, Manitoba, in 1912, he and his brother, Cecil, rented a movie theatre. From 1911 to 1914, Brooker was active in local theatre productions in Portage and Neepawa. He directed a play called Much Ado About Something at the Portage Opera House, and he seems to have acted in a number of local productions. Brooker's success at writing for films and local theatre inspired him to pursue journalism and newspaper layout design in Neepawa and then back in Portage la Prairie. In 1913, he married Mary Aurilla ("Rill") Porter, whom he had met when both were members of the St. Mary's Anglican choir in Portage. In 1914, he became editor of the Portage Review, a local newspaper. In 1915, he enlisted in the Royal Canadian Engineers in Winnipeg. After the war, he worked for The Winnipeg Tribune, The Morning Leader which became The Regina Leader-Post in 1930 and The Manitoba Free Press (The Winnipeg Free Press in 1931).

He moved to Toronto, Ontario, in 1921 to become the business manager of Marketing and Business Management magazine. In 1923, he became Promotion Manager for The Globe. In 1924, he purchased the business magazine from W.A. Lydiatt to become the editor and publisher of Marketing and Business Management. Brooker served as the magazine's editor and publisher from 1924 until 1926. In December 1927, he joined A. McKim Ltd. Advertising Agency. In 1930, he was appointed Chief of Markets and Research Department at J.J. Gibbons Limited Advertising Agency but he resigned from J.J. Gibbons in October 1940 and began to work in 1940 at MacLaren Advertising Co. where he stayed for the remainder of his career.

In 1923, as "Richard Surrey", he published his first book, Subconscious Selling: An Application of Autosuggestion to the Problems of Salesmanship.

In his social life he sought out like-minded persons with a passion for art and music. The Brookers' modest Glenview Avenue house in the middle-class neighbourhood of Lawrence Park became a meeting place for creative individuals, including the conductor Ernest MacMillan and the artists Charles Comfort, Paraskeva Clark, and Kathleen Munn. In 1936, Brooker's novel Think of the Earth (1936) became the first work to win the Governor General's Award for Fiction, although very few copies were sold.

== Artwork ==
Around 1922 to 1924, Brooker began working on a series of non-objective paintings inspired by a profoundly mystical experience during a visit to the Presbyterian church in Dwight at the Lake of Bays in Ontario around 1921. This mystical experience reinforced his spiritualism and motivated him to attempt to render the mystical in art. Brooker began painting in an abstract style, and in 1927 held his first exhibition, sponsored by his friends Lawren Harris, and Arthur Lismer at the Arts and Letters Club in Toronto. He was one of the first Canadians to paint in this style, although Kathleen Munn, Henrietta Shore and Lowrie Warrener also made abstract paintings in advance of 1927, but these were not presented in solo exhibitions before Brooker.

Brooker's first set of abstracts, from 1922 to 1924, and later works such as Ascending Forms, c.1929, appear to be inspired by the Vorticist paintings of Wyndham Lewis (1882–1957), David Bomberg (1890–1957), William Roberts (1895–1980), and Helen Saunders (1885–1963). The art of this group, particularly that of Lewis, used abstraction in sharp-edged lines to denote movement in a violent, slashing way. Brooker's first abstracts are influenced by the English group's use of precisely defined geometrical forms in aggressive contortions and highly saturated hues. Although Brooker imitated Vorticist and Futurist forms, he was by no means a proponent of the politics of those movements.

After meeting Winnipeg-born painter and printmaker, Lionel LeMoine FitzGerald, in 1929, Brooker undertook a major stylistic change, in accordance with his new friend's practice, and began to mingle naturalist and abstract elements in his work. Although he sometimes returned to pure abstraction and sometimes ventured into paintings that were essentially representational, much of his work from 1930 until the end of his life was a playful mixture of these two modes. The conjoining of two styles became characteristic of his work after 1930.

In 1931, Brooker was embroiled in a controversy about nudity in art when a painting of his was removed from the Ontario Society of Artists 59th Annual Exhibition at the Art Gallery of Toronto (now Art Gallery of Ontario) exhibition because it contained nudity. Brooker later wrote the essay "Nudes and Prudes" in 1931 as a rebuke. It was published in "Open House", edited by William Arthur Deacon and Wilfred Reeves (Ottawa: Graphic, 1931).

== Memberships ==
He was elected a member of the Ontario Society of Artists. He was a founding member of the Canadian Group of Painters and belonged as well to the Canadian Society of Painters in Water Colour.

== Legacy ==
In 1972, the National Gallery of Canada held Bertram Brooker: A Retrospective Exhibition, which travelled nationally.

In 2024, the McMichael Canadian Art Collection organized a retrospective curated by Michael Parke-Taylor, titled "Bertram Brooker: When We Awake!"

== Brooker bibliography ==
- Subconscious Selling (1923)
- Layout Technique in Advertising (1929), writing as Richard W. Surrey
- Copy Technique in Advertising (1930), writing as Richard W. Surrey
- Yearbook of the Arts in Canada, (1929–30, 1936) edited by Brooker
- Elijah (1929), drawings published November 1929
- Think of the Earth (1936)
- The Tangled Miracle (1936), writing as Huxley Herne
- The Robber: A Tale of the Time of the Herods (New York: Duell, Sloan and Pearce, 1949; Published in Canada by Collins, 1949)
- Sounds Assembling: The Poetry of Bertram Brooker (1980)
