= Thomas Beattie =

Thomas Beattie may refer to:

- Thomas Beattie (politician) (1844–1914), Canadian politician.
- Thomas Beattie (footballer) (born 1986), English entrepreneur and footballer
- Thomas Kevin Beattie (1953–2018), English footballer

== See also ==
- Thomas Beatie (born 1974), American public speaker, author, and advocate of transgender and sexuality issues
- Thomas Beattie Roberton (1879–1936), Scottish-born Canadian journalist
