= Liberal Party of Canada candidates in the 1974 Canadian federal election =

The Liberal Party of Canada fielded a full slate of candidates in the 1974 federal election, and won 141 out of 264 seats to form a majority government under Prime Minister Pierre Elliott Trudeau. Many of the party's candidates have their own biography pages; information about others may be found here.

== Ontario ==
=== Nickel Belt: Gil Mayer ===
Gil Mayer was a 44-year-old television personality and account executive with Cambrian Broadcasting at the time of the election. He is known locally for playing the character of "Marcel Mucker", a down-to-earth French Canadian miner, on CKSO-TV's local variety show Inco Presents and in comedic editorials. The Globe and Mail described his 1974 campaign against New Democratic Party (NDP) incumbent John Rodriguez as one of the most bitter in Ontario. The two candidates held differing views on Inco: Rodriguez called for its nationalization, while Mayer argued that the company had been scapegoated by the NDP. Mayer ultimately received 13,451 votes (37.90%) for a second-place finish against Rodriguez.

His son, Marc Mayer, was appointed as the director of the National Gallery of Canada in December 2008.
