= Warrener =

Warrener is a surname. Notable people with the surname include:

- Lowrie Warrener (1900–1983), Canadian painter
- Megan Warrener (born 2003), Canadian ice hockey player
- Patrice Warrener (active 21st century), French light artist
- Rhett Warrener (born 1976), Canadian ice hockey player
- William T. Warrener (1861–1934), English painter

== See also ==
- 21671 Warrener, a minor planet
