= Lowrie Warrener =

Canadian abstract painter (1900-1983)

- Born: Lowrie Lyle Warrener; January 29, 1900; Sarnia, Ontario
- Died: February 8, 1983 (aged 83); Toronto, Ontario, Canada
- Education: Ontario College of Art, Toronto (1921–1924); Académie Royale des Beaux-Arts, Antwerp (1924); Académie de la Grande Chaumière, Paris (1924).

Lowrie Warrener (January 29, 1900 – February 2, 1983) was a Canadian painter who was a pioneer of modernism, along with Kathleen Munn and Bertram Brooker.

== Biography ==
Warrener was inspired to begin painting when he met Arthur Lismer at a 1920 exhibition hosted by the Sarnia Women’s Conservation Committee at the Sarnia Carnegie Library. He was initially influenced by the Group of Seven's colour and style. In 1921, he left Sarnia for Toronto to attend the Ontario College of Art, to study sculpture and painting.

Upon graduation, in 1945, he travelled to Europe, going to Antwerp to study at the Académie Royale des Beaux-Arts (with a letter of introduction from his teacher, Arthur Lismer, who had studied there). In 1924, he also worked at the Académie de la Grande Chaumière in Paris, an open studio.

About 1925, he discovered the book Art by Clive Bell (1914) and read it with enthusiasm. He wrote about reading it to a fellow-student at the Ontario College of Art, Carl Schaefer, in letters that are today in Ottawa in the Library and Archives Canada, in the Carl Schaefer Papers, MG 30 D-171. In these letters, he stressed the necessity in painting for strong design, the solid and three-dimensional. He told Schaefer to use figures as designs and turn everything into a form you can take hold of. He advised to put in the colour the shape suggested and forget about whether a thing looks natural.

When he returned to Canada in 1925, he proved he had taken to heart the lesson of art abroad. His work was in a flat-patterned, decorative landscape style. Among other characteristics, he used strong colour and a red contour line. As a result, he was asked to be a contributor to the Group of Seven's 1926 exhibition, a signal honour. In 1926, Warrener had an exhibition of his own at the Sarnia Carnegie Library and sold 25 paintings. It too was considered a triumph. In the years from 1926 to 1934, Warrener's abstracted work, perhaps under the influence of Lawren Harris, became dark and simplified into blocky semi-geometric shapes, as in Solitude (Robert McLaughlin Gallery, Oshawa), painted by Warrener in 1929.

In 1930, Warrener became a set designer for avant-garde theatre, even writing a play to put on with one by play-wright and teacher Herman Voaden. Warrener intended the play to combine drama, music and pantomime.

Warrener painted sporadically in the years which followed. In 2009, Cassandra Getty at the Art Gallery of Windsor curated the show, Kathleen Munn and Lowrie Warrener: The Logic of Nature, the Romance of Space.

When Warrener was eighty-two, he spoke of his lack of knowledge when he chose to paint abstractly. He said that he did not know what abstract was. He simply chose colour that he liked and filled space. He called what he painted an abstract impression of colour. However, in the period 1925–1930, along with Kathleen Munn, who knew about Paul Cézanne, and Bertram Brooker who combined simple geometric forms with differently coloured planes in his work, he was a pioneer of Canadian modernism.

== Public collections ==
- Canadian War Museum, Ottawa
- Confederation Centre Art Gallery, Charlottetown
- Judith and Norman Alix Art Gallery, Sarnia
- McMichael Canadian Art Collection, Kleinburg
- National Gallery of Canada, Ottawa
- The Robert McLaughlin Gallery, Oshawa
