= Landscape Artist of the Year Canada =

Canadian reality competition series

Landscape Artist of the Year Canada is a Canadian reality competition series, which premiered in 2020 on Makeful and CBC Gem. An adaptation of the British series Landscape Artist of the Year, the series featured Canadian artists, both amateur and professional, competing to produce the best landscape paintings of scenes in Canadian nature.

The series is hosted by Sook-Yin Lee, with artist Joanne Tod and curator Marc Mayer as judges, and art historian Ian Dejardin as a commentator on the history of landscape art in Canada. The winner of the series receives a $10,000 cash prize, and has their work displayed at the McMichael Canadian Art Collection gallery in Kleinburg, Ontario.

The series entered production in 2019. Its first season aired in winter 2020 on Makeful, and was added to CBC Gem in the fall.

The first season was won by Nelson Cheng, an artist from Toronto, Ontario.

The series received two Canadian Screen Award nominations at the 9th Canadian Screen Awards in 2021, for Best Direction in a Reality or Competition Program or Series (Graeme Lynch) and Best Writing in a Lifestyle or Reality/Competition Program or Series (Carly Spencer), both for the episode "Midland Town Dock".
