= Delia, Lady Millar =

British art historian

Delia Mary, Lady Millar (1931–2004; née Dawnay) C.V.O., was a specialist in the art of the Victorian era, she was appointed Commander of the Royal Victorian Order in recognition of her services to the Royal Collection. She was the wife of the British art historian and Surveyor of the Queen’s Pictures, Sir Oliver Nicholas Millar.

== Early life and education ==
Delia Mary Dawnay was born on 18 January 1931 to Lt.-Col. Cuthbert Henry Dawnay and Marjorie Kathleen Dawnay (née Loder) in Yorkshire. She attended Queen Margaret's School, Castle Howard, Yorkshire and went on to study at the Courtauld Institute of Art, graduating in 1953 with a first class honours degree (BA) in History of Art. When she was at the Courtauld she donated photographs to the Conway Library whose archive of primarily architectural images is in the process of being digitised.

== Later life ==
While a student at the Courtauld she met her husband Oliver Millar who was at that time Deputy Surveyor of the Royal Collection and occasional lecturer at the Institute. They married on 21 January 1954 at the Queen’s Chapel, Marlborough Gate, in London and, until the children came along, lived in a grace and favour apartment in Friary Court, St James’s Palace. The couple had four children, three daughters and a son.

As well as being a wife and mother, Delia Millar worked on various publications associated with the British Royal family and, in particular, the art collected and/or commissioned by Queen Victoria. Her main contribution to the Royal Collection is her work on the two volume catalogue The Victorian Watercolours and Drawings in the Collection of Her Majesty The Queen, for which she was honoured with the C.V.O. in the New Years Honours of 1996.

There is a 2001 portrait of Sir Oliver Millar with Lady Millar in the collection of the National Portrait Gallery by their daughter, Lucy Dickens, as part of a series of 42 photographs she took to celebrate the art establishment at the beginning of the millennium. Sir Oliver Millar, a leading scholar on the work of Anthony van Dyck, owned Van Dyck's oil painting of Princess Mary (1637), the eldest daughter of King Charles I. After his death in 2007, the painting was offered, in lieu of inheritance tax, in memory of both Sir Oliver and Lady Millar on condition that it was returned to Hampton Court Palace. Her husband’s work on Van Dyck: A Complete Catalogue of the Paintings, is dedicated to Lady Millar in acknowledgement of the help she gave him.

Lady Millar died from cancer in 2004.

== Publications ==
- Queen Victoria's Life in the Scottish Highlands : depicted by her watercolour artists, London : P. Wilson Publishers, c1985, ISBN 0856671940
- The Highlanders of Scotland : the complete watercolours commissioned by Queen Victoria from Kenneth MacLeay of her Scottish retainers and clansmen, introduction and notes on the plates by Delia Millar, preface & notices by Amelia Murray MacGregor, London : Haggerston, 1986, ISBN 186981200X
- The Royal Estates of Britain, with photographs by E. A. Beesley and G. Gibbons, London : Viking, c1991, ISBN 0670829056
- The Victorian Watercolours and Drawings in the Collection of Her Majesty The Queen, (two volume catalogue), London : Philip Wilson, 1995, ISBN 0856674362
- Watercolours by Charlotte, Viscountess Canning, Lady in Waiting to Queen Victoria, Leeds : Harewood House Trust, 1996, ISBN 1899928014
- Royal Patronage and Influence in ‘The Victorian Vision Inventing New Britain’, ed. John M. Mackenzie, London : Victoria and Albert Museum Publications, 2001, ISBN 1851773274
