= Lucassie Nowra =

Inuk artist

Lucassie Sandy Nowra
- Born: 1925
- Died: 1993 (aged 67–68)

Lucassie Sandy Nowra (1925 – 1993) was an Inuk artist.

His work is included in the collections of the Musée national des beaux-arts du Québec, the McMichael Canadian Art Collection and the Brooklyn Museum
