= Desmond Shawe-Taylor =

Surveyor of the Queen's Pictures

Desmond Philip Shawe-Taylor CVO (born 30 September 1955) was Surveyor of the Queen's Pictures from 2005 to 2020. He succeeded Christopher Lloyd on Lloyd's retirement.

== Early life ==
Shawe-Taylor is the son of Brian Newton Shawe-Taylor and Jocelyn Cecilia Shawe-Taylor. He was educated at Shrewsbury School, University College, Oxford, and the Courtauld Institute of Art in London.

== Career ==
Shawe-Taylor was a lecturer in the History of Art Department of the University of Nottingham from 1979 to 1996, and director of Dulwich Picture Gallery from 1996 to 2005, when he was succeeded by Ian Dejardin. He has published several books: Genial Company: the theme of genius in eighteenth-century British portraiture, 1987; The Georgians: eighteenth-century portraiture and society, 1990; Dramatic Art: theatrical paintings from the Garrick Club, 1997; Rembrandt to Gainsborough: masterpieces from Dulwich Picture Gallery, 1999; Shakespeare in Art, 2003; Bruegel to Rubens: masters of Flemish painting, 2007; and The Conversation Piece: scenes of fashionable life, 2009.

He was made redundant in December 2020, following the news that the Royal Collections Trust "expects to lose £64m in income this year because Buckingham Palace and other sites have been shut to visitors." The role remained vacant until 2023, when he was replaced by Anna Reynolds.

Shawe-Taylor was appointed Lieutenant of the Royal Victorian Order (LVO) in 2011 and Commander of the Royal Victorian Order (CVO) in the 2021 Birthday Honours.

== Family ==
In 1987, Shawe-Taylor married Rosemary North. They have three children: Marianne, Edward and William.

Cultural offices
Preceded by Giles Waterfield	Director of Dulwich Picture Gallery; 1996–2005	Succeeded by Ian Dejardin
Preceded by Christopher Lloyd	Surveyor of the Queen's Pictures; 2005–2020	Succeeded by Anna Reynolds (2023)
