= Joanne Tod =

Canadian contemporary artist and lecturer

- Born: 1953 (age 72–73); Montreal, Quebec, Canada
- Notable work: Oh, Canada – A Lament (2007 - 2011)
- Movement: Postmodern
- Website: https://www.joannetod.com

Joanne Tod RCA (born 1953 in Montreal, Quebec, Canada) is a Canadian contemporary artist and lecturer whose paintings are known for evoking social critique in the form of the painting style known as Realism. Her work is in the permanent collections of the National Gallery of Canada, the Art Gallery of Ontario in Toronto and the Montreal Museum of Fine Arts. Her work is sometimes called "postmodern".

== Early work ==
Shortly after graduating from the Ontario College of Art (now OCAD University), Tod was included in the exhibition YYZ Monumenta in 1982, an exhibition that spread over six spaces in Toronto's Queen Street West neighbourhood: A.R.C., Gallery 76, Grunwald Gallery, Mercer Union, Studio 620, and YYZ Artists' Outlet. This exhibition became a pivotal moment for the young painter's career, launching her "from relative obscurity of the Queen Street West artist-run centres into considerable national attention."

Tod is among a group of artists working in Toronto in the late 1970s and early 1980s in the Queen Street West neighbourhood, where Canadian artists across the country migrated, creating an energetic art community in the city. She has become known for her figurative paintings from photographs, using irony to challenge stereotypes, expose vulnerabilities and unsettle assumptions about women, race and social status. Her technical range as a painter was acknowledged early in her career and she uses her skill to surprise viewers by juxtaposing incongruous objects with well-executed representational images.

== Work from 2000 on ==
In his review of Tod's 2000 exhibition entitled "The Republic of Private" at Toronto's Sable-Castelli Gallery, The Globe and Mail art critic Gary Michael Dault described Tod's paintings as "dizzying realism" with "high sensuous, meditative brushwork that abstracts its subject at the very same time as it nails it down." Dault calls Tod a virtuoso, with meticulously detailed enigmatic paintings that are "lushly crafted." But the paintings are at times unexpectedly wry, with subtle jokes and puzzles. In her series entitled "Oh, Canada — a Lament" (2007–2011) Tod painted 121 small portraits of Canadians who died in Afghanistan. The Walrus published the series as a visual essay in 2011. Tod, who has worked in collaboration with the Gardiner Museum for years and was familiar with their historical ceramics collection, decorated a series of plates featuring contemporary figures and themes from popular culture while using visual references to the historical works. In the exhibition entitled "Invited Invasion," her ceramics were interspersed with the historical collection, hiding objects in plain sight and challenging ways of seeing in the traditional museum setting. As a feminist she drew attention to the fact that historically, women were not the producers of the ceramics themselves; they were only allowed to decorate them.

There is material about Tod in Library and Archives Canada.

== Teaching ==
Tod lectures at the Visual Studies program at the University of Toronto.

In 2020, she appeared as a judge on Landscape Artist of the Year Canada.

== Selected public exhibitions ==
- Hamilton, ON, Art Gallery of Hamilton
- Kingston, ON, Agnes Etherington Art Centre, Queen's University
- Lethbridge, AB, University of Lethbridge
- Montreal, QC, Leonard and Bina Ellen Art Gallery, Concordia University
- Montreal, QC, Musée d'art contemporain de Montréal
- Oakville, ON, Oakville Galleries
- Oshawa, ON, Robert McLaughlin Gallery
- Ottawa, ON, Canada Council Art Bank
- Ottawa, ON, House of Commons, Government of Canada
- Ottawa, ON, National Gallery of Canada
- Sarnia, ON, Sarnia Public Library
- Sudbury, ON, Laurentian University and Art Centre
- Toronto, ON, Art Gallery of Ontario
- Toronto, ON, Hart House, University of Toronto
- Vancouver, BC, Vancouver Art Gallery

== Awards ==
- Canada Council Project Grant, 2011;
- Canada Council Senior Artist Creation/Production Grant, 2000;
- Ontario Arts Council, Senior Artist Grant, Research/Production, 1993;
- Canada Council B Grant, 1983;
- Ontario Arts Council Project Grant, 1983;
