= Sarah Milroy =

Canadian museum director and curator (born 1957)

- Born: Sarah Nichol; 1957 (age 68–69); Vancouver, British Columbia
- Known for: curator, museum director, writer
- Spouse: Tom Milroy
- Awards: Order of Canada (2022)

Sarah Milroy CM (born 1957) is the executive director and chief curator of the McMichael Canadian Art Collection in Kleinburg, Ontario, responsible for the 2021 exhibition and editor of the book Uninvited: Canadian women artists in the modern moment (2021), as well as co-editing with Ian Dejardin, the previous director, Tom Thomson: North Star (2023) and contributing to numerous books on art, including Mary Pratt, From the Forest to the Sea: Emily Carr in British Columbia, David Milne: Modern Painting and co-editing Early Days: Indigenous Art at the McMichael. She is a champion of the art of Canada.

== Early years ==
Milroy was born in Vancouver, the third daughter of Elizabeth Nichol (née Fellowes), who founded Vancouver's Equinox Gallery in 1972 and John Lang Nichol, a Liberal politician and senator who served in the Second World War and was made a Companion of the Order of Canada. She grew up in Vancouver but travelled to Montreal to study English literature at McGill University (BA 1979), then to Newnham College at Cambridge University in England (NC 1980), and Hunter College in New York where she received a master's in art history. She planned to be a teacher, but an exhibition of Paraskeva Clark in 1982 changed her focus. Having written about the show for the journal Canadian Forum, she decided to write about art.

== Career ==
From 1984 to 1996, she wrote for the journal Canadian Art, and in 1991 became its editor and publisher. She also contributed to the CBC as a visual arts correspondent. In 1996, she began working for the Globe and Mail covering the visual arts in Vancouver. She became the newspaper's chief art critic in 2001 and remained there until 2011, afterwards working as an independent art critic and curator.

She co-curated three international exhibitions for the Dulwich Picture Gallery in London in collaboration with its then Sackler director, Ian Dejardin (afterwards executive director of the McMichael Canadian Art Collection until 2023): From the Forest to the Sea: Emily Carr in British Columbia (shown at the Art Gallery of Ontario, 2015); Vanessa Bell (2016) and David Milne: Modern Painting (2018) shown in Canada at the Vancouver Art Gallery and the McMichael Canadian Art Collection. Milroy also wrote essays for catalogues, often for shows she curated or co-curated, on artists such as Greg Curnoe (2001) and Jack Chambers (2011), both for the Art Gallery of Ontario, as well as Mary Pratt (2013), Lionel LeMoine FitzGerald (2019), Gathie Falk (2022) and others.

In 2018, Milroy was made chief curator at the McMichael and she and the museum worked to continue broadening the collection guidelines and rebalancing the narrative, bringing in black, Indigenous and people of colour artists, as well as focusing on women artists. For instance, she and Dejardin balanced and co-curated A Like Vision: the Group of Seven & Tom Thomson, works selected from the gallery's collection by members of the Group of Seven, to mark the 100th anniversary of its founding and an exhibition of Tom Thomson, (both also edited the accompanying book catalogues for the shows) with Uninvited: Canadian Women Artists in the Modern Moment, this time curated by Milroy, a show which also had a major book catalogue edited by her, on 40 modernist Canadian women painters, each one accompanied in the text by a scholarly essay by Canadian art historians.

Uninvited upheld the accomplishments of women artists and was widely reviewed as offering a wider and more inclusive picture of the visual arts in Canada during a pivotal modern period. In 2020, she also curated the significant landmark show Early Days: Indigenous Art at the McMichael and co-edited with Bonnie Devine and John Geoghegan its massive catalogue titled Early Days: Indigenous Art from the McMichael with mostly indigenous contributors writing about the Indigenous objects chosen from the more than 1,500 owned by the McMichael, published in 2023. In 2023, under Milroy's directorship, the McMichael Canadian Art Collection hired its first Associate Curator: Indigenous Art and Culture. In 2024, with Anne-Marie Bouchard, she co-curated the exhibition and co-authored the book/catalgue of River of Dreams: Impressionism on the St. Lawrence.

Milroy has served as a member of the Canada Committee of Human Rights Watch, a board member of the Art Canada Institute, and a member of the Editorial Advisory board of the Inuit Art Quarterly.

== Selected publications ==
Among her many publications, she was the author of "Maud Lewis: Paintings for sale",

== Awards and honours ==
- 2018: Milroy's cover story on Jessie Oonark OC, RCA (1906–1985) for the Inuit Art Quarterly's 30th Anniversary issue, was shortlisted for Best Editorial Package at the National Magazine Awards;
- 2020: Milroy was made a Member of the Order of Canada for her role in promoting Canadian art and artists;
- 2022: Uninvited received the Canadian Museum Association Award for "Outstanding Achievement - Research".
