= Christopher Lloyd (art historian) =

British art historian

Christopher Hamilton Lloyd CVO (born 30 June 1945) is a British art historian and was Surveyor of The Queen's Pictures (1988–2005).

Lloyd worked in the Department of Western Art at the Ashmolean Museum in Oxford for twenty years. In 1972, he was appointed to a fellowship at Harvard University's Center for Renaissance Studies, Villa I Tatti, in Florence, Italy. During 1980–81, he was a visiting research curator at the Art Institute of Chicago, concentrating on the art of early Italy.

In 1988, Lloyd was appointed Surveyor of The Queen's Pictures for the Royal Collection, one of the largest and most important art collections in the world, held in trust by Queen Elizabeth II as Sovereign for her successors and the United Kingdom. The paintings comprise one of the best known and most significant elements of the Collection. Working to the Director of the Royal Collection, Lloyd had overall curatorial responsibility for some 7,000 oil paintings and 3,000 miniatures. Lloyd retired as Surveyor of The Queen's Pictures in July 2005 and was succeeded by Desmond Shawe-Taylor.

Lloyd was appointed a Lieutenant of the Royal Victorian Order (LVO) in the 1996 New Year Honours, and promoted to Commander of the Order (CVO) in the 2002 New Year Honours.

Cultural offices
| Preceded by Sir Oliver Millar | Surveyor of the Queen's Pictures; 1988–2005 | Succeeded by Desmond Shawe-Taylor |
