= Think of the Earth =

1936 novel by Bertram Brooker

- Author: Bertram Brooker
- Language: English
- Genre: Fiction
- Publisher: Nelson & Sons
- Publication date: 1936
- Publication place: Canada
- Pages: 288

Think of the Earth is a 1936 novel by the Canadian novelist Bertram Brooker. The book won the first Governor General's Award for fiction in 1936.

== Synopsis ==
An expatriate Englishman has a weekend of self-discovery in Manitoba: he falls in love, and realizes that he must become less introspective. The protagonist, Geoff Tavistock, visits a small town in rural Manitoba in 1907. Tavistock believes he is on a divinely inspired mission - to reconcile man with God once and for all.

== Reception ==
Sales of the initial publication in 1936 were slow and Brooker acknowledged that by the time his book was awarded the Governor General's Award, only eight copies had been sold.

Think of the Earth has been portrayed as an example of ressentiment, a retelling of Crime and Punishment set as a historical novel of the Canadian Prairies in which a Nietzschean superman dreams of bringing his transvalued sense of justice to a primitive rural society.

Literary critic John Moss characterized the book as being about a visionary experience but the book was not a visionary experience in itself. Moss called the prose awkward and the mood sombre. The protagonist Tavistock is portrayed as an eccentric without any trace of irony, an improbable messiah. Brooker's primary role as an abstract artist did not translate well to the medium of writing.
