= Abraham van der Doort =

Portrait of Abraham van Dort, by William Dobson, c. 1640

Abraham van der Doort, baptismal name Abraham van Dort (baptized in Antwerp on 1 January 1575 - buried in London on 23 May 1640) was a Flemish medallist, painter, draughtsman, wax modeler, collection cataloger, collections curator and courtier. He worked for various Euopean princes including Holy Roman Emperor Rudolph II, Johann Adolf, Duke of Holstein-Gottorp, the Landgrave of Hesse-Kassel Maurice, Henry Frederick, Prince of Wales and English Kings James VI and I and Charles I. As the first Surveyor of the King's Pictures he compiled the first extensive catalogue of the king's art collection, which now forms a key source for our knowledge of the growth, arrangement and quality of that collection. As the King's Provider of Patterns he was responsible for the design of key coins minted during the reign of Charles I. His 1625 appointment as the King's Groom of the Chamber shows his close relationship with Charles I.

== Life ==
=== Antwerp ===
Van Dort's careworn face is familiar from the portrait by William Dobson at the Hermitage Museum in Saint Petersburg. The details of his early life and training, however, have been less well preserved. It was formerly believed that he was a son of Peter van Do[o]rt (sometimes also called Paul van der Doort), a Flemish engraver from Antwerp who worked in Hamburg around the turn of the 17th century. He has now been identified with the Abraham van Dort who was baptized in Antwerp's Church of Our Lady (now the Cathedral of Antwerp) on 1 January 1575. Abraham was the son of Cornelis van Dort II (1546-after 1603) and Catharina Beys. His father was a goldsmith who was admitted as a master of the Antwerp Guild of Saint Luke in the capacity of 'wijnmeester' (i.e. master by patrimony) in 1571. Abraham's mother came from a family of wealthy goldsmiths from Breda. His siblings included a sister Susanna and two brothers Jacob (c. 1575-1629) and Isaac (1576-?) who were painters with international careers. He was possibly also related to the Paulus (Petrus) van der Do[o]rt who was formerly identified as his father. His grandfather Cornelis van Dort I (1523-81) had operated a jewellery shop near the Saint James Church in the heart of Antwerp. A number of members of the Antwerp van (der) Dort family were silversmiths, goldsmiths, medalists and engravers.

From the 1560s the Spanish Netherlands experienced intense social turmoil caused by the rise of Calvinism and other Protestant denominations in the traditionally Catholic Spanish Netherlands and the attempts of the authorities to suppress the new religious movements. This period was marked by repeated acts of iconoclasm (called Beeldenstorm in Dutch) which reached their peak in 1566 when many Catholic churches, including in Antwerp, were attacked by mobs which smashed and destroyed Catholic artworks, church fittings and decorations. The upheaval evolved into the so-called Dutch Revolt, an armed conflict between Spanish armies and various rebel groups which eventually lead to several Northern provinces breaking away from the Spanish Netherlands. After the 1576 Spanish Fury, i.e. the sacking of Antwerp by Spanish forces, Antwerp took the side of the rebels. Antwerp's alliance with the Protestant cause ended on 17 August 1585, when after a year-long siege Antwerp fell to the Spanish troops. Protestants were then given the choice to convert back to Catholicism or leave the Spanish Netherlands. It is in this historical context that the family van Dort left Antwerp between 1576 and 1584. Some of its members such as Cornelis II and Jacob are recorded in Hamburg in 1603. They were members of the Netherlandish Reformed Church in Altona, a city located to the west of Hamburg.

=== Hamburg ===
It is likely that Abraham also resided with his family in Hamburg between c. 1595 and 1600. The account books of Johann Adolf, Duke of Holstein-Gottorp record that in 1596 three payments were made to Abraham for wax sculptures and paintings. He made five portraits of the Duke of which four molded in wax and one painted. It is therefore possible that around that time he worked at the Duke's Gottorf Castle in the Duchy of Holstein-Gottorp, not far from Hamburg.

=== England ===
Hearse with the funeral effigy of Prince Henry Frederick, Van Dort made the wax face and hands of the effigy.

It is believed that Abraham van Dort came to England around 1610, a few years after James I became King of England. Here he entered the service of the Prince of Wales Henry. It was traditionally assumed that Abraham spent time in Prague in 1609 in the service of the Holy Roman Emperor Rudolph II. This was a misconception derived from George Vertue's stating in his 1757 edition of the catalogue of King Charles I's art collection that Abraham van Dort had produced a large bust for Emperor Rudolph. On the basis of this it had been assumed that he had worked in Prague for the Emperor but there is no evidence for this. According to Vertue, the bust was made in colored wax and depicted the life-size head of a woman laid in with silver and gold on top of a black ebony pedestal. Van Dort had handed over this bust to Prince Henry who did not allow him to send it to the Emperor. In return for keeping the bust in England, Prince Henry promised Abraham to make him his Keeper of his collection of medals and other items and pay him an annual salary of £50. The Prince died in 1612 before fully honoring his promises to Van Dort. The Prince's body lay in state for a month at St James' Palace prior to its transfer to Westminster Abbey for his funeral. In the Abbey an elaborate hearse was erected on which the Prince's funeral effigy was placed. The effigy was clothed with the robes worn by the Prince at his creation as Prince of Wales in 1610. The wooden frame of the effigy was made by Richard Norris while the wax face and hands were modelled by Van Dort. Of the effigy only the wooden frame has survived. The robes were stolen as early as 1616 and the head had disappeared by 1872.

After Prince Henry's death in 1612, his collection of paintings, medals, coins and other objets d'art was inherited by Prince Charles. The latter did not immediately appoint Van Dort as the curator of his cabinet. The artist continued to secure from time to time commissions from the Court as testified by various payment warrants received by him such as a warrant for £30 dated 16 March 1618 for "drawing His Majesty's picture at length", a warrant for £80 dated 4 May 1620 for "ymbossing two portrayts of his Majestie and attending his Majestie at Newmarket, Royston and other places about the same" and a warrant for £420 dated 8 August 1620 for "14 portrait boxes and cases as well of his Majesty as of the late Queen and remaining in the late Queen's Cabinet at Whitehall". King James I was known for his interest in medals and medallic portraits. Van Dort may have contributed to the anonymous series of medals in his collection which has survived. Some of the portraits referred to in the warrants were made in wax, a medium in which Van Dort was experienced. The sums he received for his work during this period were higher than those he received in his later career.

=== Kassel ===
Portrait of Maurice, Landgrave of Hesse-Kassel attributed to Abraham van Dort

Van der Dort left London after 9 September 1615 in the company of Jacob Segar, the son of the portrait painter William Segar. They traveled to Kassel, (Germany) where they likely arrived in early October. Segar is believed to have returned home after settling matters relating to the estate of his uncle Francis Segar who had been in the service of Maurice, Landgrave of Hesse-Kassel at the time of his death. Van Dort stayed until at least 9 February 1616 in Kassel where he worked for the Landgrave Maurice. The latter recommended Van Dort to King James of England while at the same time pleading with the King to settle Van Dort's unpaid salaries.

It is not clear which works van Dort may have created during his stay in Kassel. Maurice is known to have commissioned multiple wax portraits of himself whose creators are unknown. Based on information on Van Dort's commissions from Emperor Rudolf and the Stuart court it may be assumed that he was responsible for some of them. A life-sized, effigy-like head of Maurice with inserted glass pupils and lashes made of real hair in the collection of the Museumslandschaft Hessen Kassel has been tentatively attributed to Van Dort.

=== Return to England ===
Page 78 from the manuscript copy of the Catalogue of the collection of pictures, medals, agates and the like, of King Charles I (Royal Collection)

At an unknown time during the reign of James I, Van Dort was appointed "Curator of the Limbed (sic = limned?) peces and hereafter may belong" to the King, a post that he was previously supposed to take in the service of Prince Henry. His annual salary was £40, which was £10 less than that was earliers promised to him by Prince Henry. He was held in high regard by James as on 24 March 1625 (only three days before the death of the King) he was awarded a daily royal allowance of 5 shillings and sixpence (about £0.1375) for the remainder of his life starting from the Christmas day of 1624. In later years Van Dort was forced to chase for payment of the various allowances granted to him by the King.

Soon after Charles succeeded his father as king in 1625, Van Dort was granted four court positions connected with the Arts, each with an annual salary of £40. The posts were the Keeper of the King's Cabinet of Medals, Overseer (Surveyor) of the King's Pictures, Master-Imbosser or Maker of Medals and Provider of Patterns.

At the time there were in London tensions between the foreign and local artists. In 1627 the Painter-Stainers' Company unsuccessfully attempted to prosecute Flemish and Dutch artists including Abraham van Dort, Cornelis de Neve, Daniel Mytens and George Geldorp for failing to comply with the Company's ordinances.

In the period 1627-1628 Van Dort was one of the foreigners lodging in the Palace of Westminster. In 1628 Van Dort made written complaints for non-payment of his salary for a period of about 40 months. It is not clear whether he was succcessful in his claim. On 28 November 1628 Lord Conway addressed a letter recommending Van Dort in marriage to Louysa (Louisa) Cole (maiden name L'Obel), widow of James Cole, a former silk merchant in London originally from the Low Countries. The introduction seems to have borne fruit as Louisa Cole and Van Dort married on 15 August 1629 in London. In a document from 1633 Louisa Van Dort granted a 21-year lease on a property adjoining Cromwell House in Highgate which she had inherited from her first husband.

Around 1630 Van Dort was given a life-time appointment as a Groom of the Chamber of King Charles I. He was granted the benefit of an annual warrant for his livery, which was precisely described in the appointment. He also received a daily monetary allowance.

==== Van Dort and the royal coinage ====
£3 Gold Pattern Triple Unite, struck in high relief en médaille

While as the Master-Imbosser or Maker of Medals Van Dort would expected to have been involved in the production process of the coinage of King Charles I, there is no evidence that he in fact did so. There is evidence that some coins from the reign of King Charles I were made after designs by Van Dort. He produced patterns in high relief for coins of £1, £3 and £5 denominations. While the Mint may not have been able to produce for general circulation a high relief coinage according to Van Dort's pattern, a change in coinage at the end of 1625 likely represents an attempt by the Mint engraver to reproduce Vanderdort's concept although not in high relief. Six types of high-relief pattern in gold dating to the years 1630 and 1631 are believed to have been made after the patterns of Van Dort. Four of these are for the £1 coin, one for the £3 coin and one, the so-called "Juxon" medal, for the £5 coin. The "Juxon" was struck as a medal and according to legend carried by Charles I to the scaffold where he passsed it to Archbishop Juxon before his execution. The originals of the golden coins are rare, but contemporary casts in silver of some of the £1 types are more common. They all bear mint-marks allowing most of them to be dated accurately.

==== Catalogue of the royal art collection ====
King Charles' cabinet of medals of which Van Dort was the Keeper was built after the designs of Inigo Jones, the Surveyor of the King's Work. It was located in the center of Whitehall and ran across from the Thames, towards the Banqueting House and fronted westward the Privy Garden. As Overseer (Surveyor) of the King's Pictures Van Dort's duties included to oversee and take care of all the King's pictures, to prevent them from being spoiled or defaced, to order mark, number and keep a register of them, to receive and deliver them and to make and copy pictures as instructed by the King or the Lord Chamberlain. Nothing is known of the copies or original paintings (if any) that Van Dort made in this role. On 9 July 1628 he received a warrant for the delivery of three "bed ticks" presumably to be used for canvases, either for the copying of pictures in the Royal Collection or for painting portraits himself.

From about 1638, van Dort worked on a manuscript catalogue of the art collection of the King which he had finished by 15 October 1639. The catalogue was drafted in the broken English of a foreigner with numerous spelling and grammatical mistakes. It describes the coins, medals and paintings in the royal collection. Some of the wax works described in the catalogue may be Van Dort's own works. The Catalogue also mentions 55 books in the cabinet room collection. The catalogue survives in a complete manuscript that was preserved by Elias Ashmole and is now held by the Bodleian Library, and in three fair copies of sections, all of which are covered with Van Dort's annotations in a tight, crabbed hand. Under Van Dort's care, and with the guidance of painter-dealers, painter-ambassadors and English painting virtuosi, Charles had assembled what Oliver Millar (1923 – 2007) reckoned was the best single English collection of paintings ever made. Many of the works had come from the Gonzaga inheritance in Mantua.

King Charles' collection was broken up and sold by auction in 1649 after his public execution. George Vertue's notes on the former Royal Collection were published in 1757. A collated edition of the four manuscript catalogs by Van Dort was published by the Walpole Society as its Volume 37 (1958–60). It was edited by Millar, who later became a Surveyor of the Queen's Pictures. The catalogue serves as the key source for the current knowledge of the growth, arrangement and quality of King Charles I's collection.

In the summer of 1640, King Charles asked Van Dort to bring him from his collection a miniature by the English artist Richard Gibson. When Van Dort was unable to locate the miniature, he felt such embarrassment over misplacing a picture from the royal collection that he decided to hang himself. Later it was discovered that the miniature had been simply misplaced.
