= Oliver Millar =

British art historian (1923–2007)

Oliver Millar GCVO FSA FBA
- Born: Oliver Nicholas Millar; April 26, 1923; Standon, Hertfordshire, UK
- Died: May 10, 2007 (aged 84); London, UK
- Education: Rugby School; Courtauld Institute of Art
- Occupation: art historian
- Years active: 1947–1988
- Spouse: Delia Dawnay
- Children: 4
- Relatives: George du Maurier (great grandfather); Gerald du Maurier (grand uncle); Sylvia Llewelyn Davies (grand aunt); Daphne du Maurier (first cousin once removed)

Sir Oliver Nicholas Millar GCVO FSA FBA (26 April 1923 – 10 May 2007) was a British art historian. He was an expert on 17th-century British painting, and a leading authority on Anthony van Dyck in particular. He served in the Royal Household for 41 years from 1947, becoming Surveyor of The Queen's Pictures in 1972. He was the first Director of the Royal Collection from 1987. He served in both offices until his retirement in 1988.

== Early and private life ==
Millar was born in Standon, Hertfordshire. He was the elder son of Gerald Millar, MC and his wife Ruth. His paternal grandmother, Beatrix ("Trixie"), was the daughter of author George du Maurier and the sister of Gerald du Maurier (himself the father of Daphne du Maurier) and Sylvia Llewelyn Davies (whose children with Arthur Llewelyn Davies were adopted by J. M. Barrie); she had married Charlie Millar in the 1880s.

Millar was educated at Rugby School and the Courtauld Institute of Art at the University of London, graduating with an Academic Diploma in the History of Art. Among his teachers at the Courtauld was its director, Anthony Blunt. When Blunt succeeded Kenneth Clark as Surveyor of the King's Pictures in 1945, Millar asked him for a job. He became an Assistant Surveyor in 1947.

He married Delia Dawnay in 1954. She was the daughter of Lieutenant Colonel Cuthbert Dawnay, MC. They had three daughters and a son. His wife died in 2004. Three years later, he died instantaneously of a heart attack whilst walking across St James's Square in London having come from an appointment at Christie's to look at a picture by Lely.

== Career in the Royal Household ==
The Royal Collection is one of the largest and most important art collections in the world, held in trust by King Charles III as Sovereign for his successors and the United Kingdom. The paintings comprise one of the best known and most significant elements of the Collection, hanging in royal palaces and other residences, including Windsor Castle, Hampton Court, Buckingham Palace and Sandringham House.

After two years as an Assistant Surveyor, Millar was promoted to Deputy Surveyor in 1949 in place of Benedict Nicolson, who resigned to spend more time on another of his responsibilities, editing The Burlington Magazine. Millar was appointed MVO in the 1953 Coronation Honours, and advanced to CVO in the 1963 New Year Honours.

In addition to taking responsibility for much of the day-to-day administration of the Royal Collection, Millar also wrote many catalogues and other works. He published a book on Thomas Gainsborough in 1949, and another on William Dobson in 1951. He co-wrote English Art, 1625–1714 with Margaret Whinney in 1957. The same year, he selected 37 works by van Dyck to be exhibited at the winter exhibition of Flemish art at the Royal Academy. He published a catalogue of the Tudor, Stuart and Early Georgian paintings in the Royal Collection in 1963, followed by a volume of Later Georgian pictures in 1969 and a two volume catalogue of Victorian pictures in the Royal Collection in 1992.

He edited the Inventories and Valuations of the King's Goods, published in 1972, based on an inventory of the possessions of Charles I originally compiled in around 1639 by the first Surveyor, Abraham van der Doort. Millar reckoned that Charles' collection was the best single English collection of paintings ever made, but it was broken up and sold at auction in 1649 after the king was executed. Also in 1972, Millar also wrote the catalogue for an exhibition of "The Age of Charles I" at the Tate Gallery.

After 23 years as Deputy, Millar succeeded Anthony Blunt as Surveyor in 1972, and was advanced to KCVO in the 1973 Birthday Honours. The Royal Collection became more professional in its outlook under his stewardship. The Surveyor had historically been a part-time position, under the overall supervision of the Lord Chamberlain since 1625, based at St James's Palace. Millar was the first full-time Surveyor, and the Royal Collection employed its first full-time picture restorer in 1981. He broke free from the Lord Chamberlain in the 1980s, when he became the first director of the Royal Collection in 1987, adding overall responsibility for the Surveyor of the Queen's Works of Art and the Royal Librarian.

Millar continued to publish catalogues and other works. He published The Queen's Pictures in 1977, a general account of the Royal Collection, and wrote the catalogues for exhibitions of works at the National Portrait Gallery by Sir Peter Lely in 1978 and "Van Dyck in England" in 1982, selecting himself the 65 paintings and 22 drawings for the latter exhibition.

He also wrote for The Burlington Magazine and other art history journals. Between 1962 and his retirement in 1988, he was responsible for mounting 12 public exhibitions at the Queen's Gallery at Buckingham Palace, attracting almost 2.5 million visitors in all.

Millar kept extensive notes on the works of art he visited in public and private collections and indexed them by artist and collection. These journals, written between 1945 and 2006, as well as Millar's general research papers are kept in the Paul Mellon Centre's archive.

He was appointed Surveyor Emeritus and advanced to GCVO on his retirement in 1988. He wrote the chapter on Van Dyck's English period for Van Dyck, A Complete Catalogue of the Paintings, published in 2004.

In 2008, the Tate gallery purchased, with the help of the Art Fund, a sketch by Peter Paul Rubens for the Banqueting House ceiling in Whitehall in his memory.

== Other positions ==
Millar became a Fellow of the British Academy in 1970. He was a trustee of the National Portrait Gallery from 1972 to 1995, and a member of the Reviewing Committee on Export of Works of Art from 1975 to 1987. He was a member of the executive committee of the National Art Collections Fund from 1986 to 1998, and a trustee of the National Heritage Memorial Fund from 1988 to 1992. He was also a Visitor at the Ashmolean Museum from 1987 to 1993, Chairman of the Patrons of British Art from 1989 to 1997, and President of the Walpole Society from 1998 to 2007.

== Archive & library ==
Millar's archive is in the Paul Mellon Centre where it is fully catalogued and available for consultation. The archive includes journals, containing notes Millar made during visits to public and private collections in the UK and abroad, research files on artists including Anthony Van Dyck and Peter Lely, correspondence with art specialists, draft texts for the publication Van Dyck: A Complete Catalogue of the Paintings and annotated exhibition catalogues. Over four hundred books from Millar’s library are in the Paul Mellon Centre library.

Preceded by Anthony Blunt	Surveyor of the Queen's Pictures; 1972–1988	Succeeded by Christopher Lloyd
