= William Seguier =

English painter

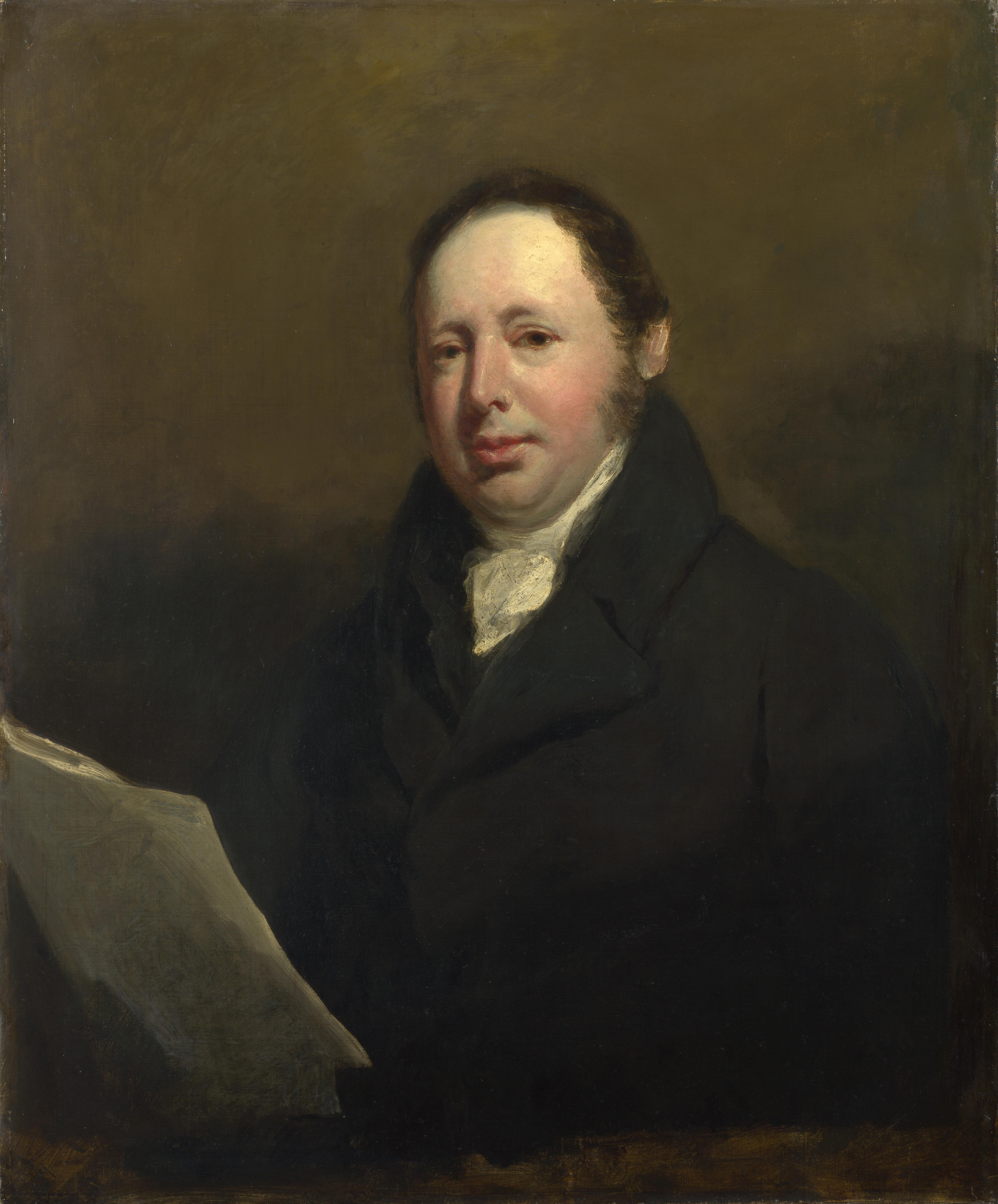
Portrait of William Seguier (1830) by John Jackson, National Gallery

William Seguier (/ˈsiːɡər/ SEE-gər; 9 November 1772 – 5 November 1843) was a British art dealer, painter, and official functionary in the art world. He was the first Keeper of the National Gallery, London.

== Early life ==
Seguier was born in the parish of St Martin-in-the-Fields in London, the descendant of French Huguenot refugees.

Many of his relatives were involved in the arts on a professional level, from his father David, a picture dealer, to his uncle on the paternal side, the sculptor Peter Seguier.

== Career ==
Initially Seguier worked as an artist; he may have been taught by George Morland and perhaps even William Blake. However, his marriage to Anne Magdalene Clowden (a fellow Huguenot), gave him the independent means to establish a dealership, and he largely gave up painting thereafter. The business, in which his brother also worked, also offered picture-cleaning and restoring services, a useful way of getting to know collectors.

From 1806, when Lord Grosvenor consulted him on the purchase of the Agar collection, Seguier's clientele became ever more aristocratic and well-connected, including such names as Sir George Beaumont, Sir Abraham Hume, Sir Robert Peel and the Duke of Wellington.

Beaumont and Grosvenor were also members of a group of connoisseurs and artists (including David Wilkie and Benjamin Haydon) that called itself "the clique", to which Seguier was admitted. Through such connections as these, the opportunistic Seguier secured a number of high-ranking official positions, beginning in 1805 with his appointment as Superintendent of the newly formed British Institution. This was followed in 1820 with the post of Surveyor of the King's Pictures, and upon the foundation of the National Gallery in 1824 he was appointed its Keeper.

The Superintendent was responsible for organizing and hanging the shows at the British Institution, a role that inevitably gave rise to grumbling and worse from artists - at the Royal Academy a committee was responsible for the hang, which allowed someone else to be blamed, but Seguier had no such opportunity to share the blame. In 1833 John Constable wrote with heavy irony of having received a visit in his studio from "a much greater man than the King—the Duke of Bedford—Lord Westminster—Lord Egremont, or the President of the Royal Academy — "MR SEGUIER"." When in 1832 two pictures by Richard Parkes Bonington, who had been dead only four years, were included in an "Old Masters" exhibition, Constable (who was twenty-six years older than Bonington) wrote that Seguier was "carrying on a Humbugg". The William Blake scholar Ruthven Todd tells us that at the National Gallery Seguier "established a reputation both for incompetence and for a passion for brown varnish, apparently agreeing with Sir George Beaumont, connoisseur and amateur artist, that a really good picture should have the color of a Cremona violin".

== Later life ==
Seguier held these three positions until his death in 1843; his brother succeeded him at the British Institution. He is buried in Brompton Cemetery, London.

== Notes ==
Honorary titles
Preceded by —	Superintendent of the British Institution; 1805–1843	Succeeded by John Seguier
Preceded by Benjamin West	Surveyor of the King's / Queen's Pictures; 1820–1843	Succeeded by Sir Augustus Wall Callcott
Preceded by —	Keeper of the National Gallery; 1824–1843	Succeeded by Sir Charles Lock Eastlake
