= Surveyor of the King's Pictures =

Department of the Royal Household of the Sovereign of the United Kingdom

The office of the Surveyor of the King's/Queen's Pictures, in the Royal Collection Department of the Royal Household of the Sovereign of the United Kingdom, is responsible for the care and maintenance of the royal collection of pictures owned by the Sovereign in an official capacity – as distinct from those owned privately and displayed at Sandringham House and Balmoral Castle and elsewhere. The office has only been full-time since 1972. It now operates in a professional capacity with a staff of a dozen people.

Although the office dates from 1625, during the reign of Charles I (a noted art connoisseur), there has always been someone responsible for pictures in the Royal Household. Notable recent office-holders have included Sir Lionel Cust (1901–1927), Sir Kenneth Clark (1934–1944), Professor Anthony Blunt (1945–1972), one of the Cambridge Five Soviet spies, and Sir Oliver Millar (1972–1988). The current surveyor is Anna Reynolds, who was appointed in December 2023. She is the first woman to hold the position.

The previous surveyor was Desmond Shawe-Taylor, who held the post from 2005 to 2020. The post of Surveyor of the King's Pictures was in abeyance until 3 December 2023.

== List of Surveyors of the King's/Queen's Pictures ==
- Abraham van der Doort 1625–1640
- George Geldorp 1660–
- Thomas Chiffinch 1660–1666
- William Chiffinch 1666–1688
- Gerrit van Uylenburgh 1676–1679
- Parry Walton 1679–1690 (officially to 1701)
- Henry Norris 1682–
- Frederick Sonnius 1690–1701
- Peter Walton c.1690–1745 (officially from 1701)
- Stephen Slaughter 1745–1765
- George Knapton 1765–1778
- Richard Dalton 1778–1791
- Benjamin West 1791–1820
- William Seguier 1820–1843
- Sir Augustus Wall Callcott 1843–1844
- Thomas Uwins 1844–1856
- Richard Redgrave 1856–1880
- Sir John Charles Robinson 1880–1901
- Sir Lionel Cust 1901–1927
- C. H. Collins Baker 1928–1934
- Sir Kenneth Clark 1934–1944
- Sir Anthony Blunt 1945–1973
- Sir Oliver Millar 1972–1988
- Christopher Lloyd 1988–2005
- Desmond Shawe-Taylor 2005–2020
- Anna Reynolds 2023–
