= Ian Dejardin =

English art historian (born 1955)

- Born: Ian A. C. Dejardin; 26 August 1955 (age 71)
- Education: University of Edinburgh (M.A. History of Art); University of Warwick (PhD, incomplete)
- Known for: Dulwich Picture Gallery, Former director
- Scientific career
- Fields: Art history
- Workplaces: Dulwich Picture Gallery, Director (2005–2017); McMichael Canadian Art Collection, Chief executive (2017–2023)

Ian A. C. Dejardin (born 26 August 1955) is an art historian who was director of the Dulwich Picture Gallery in Dulwich, England. In August 2016 Dulwich Picture Gallery announced that he would be leaving to become chief executive of the McMichael Canadian Art Collection in Ontario in April 2017. He is married to Eric Pearson, his partner since 1987, and lives in Toronto, Canada.

== Career ==
Ian Dejardin holds an MA in the history of art from the University of Edinburgh. He started a doctorate in art history at the University of Warwick, but then spent seven years developing a designer knitwear business in Cumbria with former partner Brian Ashley. Subsequently, he completed a postgraduate diploma in art gallery and museum studies at Manchester University. This was followed by curatorial appointments at the Royal Academy of Arts, London, and with English Heritage (London Region).

In 1998, Dejardin was appointed as curator at Dulwich Picture Gallery and was responsible for the gallery's permanent collection of paintings, furniture and works on paper, and for delivering the gallery's exhibition programme. He succeeded Desmond Shawe-Taylor as director in 2005. As director, he was responsible for coordinating several major exhibitions a year. He personally co-curated Henry Moore: at Dulwich Picture Gallery in 2004. In 2011, he was lead curator of the first major exhibition in Britain since 1925 dedicated to Canada's most famous artists: Painting Canada: Tom Thomson and the Group of Seven. This was followed in 2014 by another Canadian-themed show, From the Forest to the Sea: Emily Carr and British Columbia, co-curated with Sarah Milroy, with whom he was to further collaborate on Vanessa Bell (2016), and David Milne (2017). In August 2016 the Dulwich Picture Gallery announced that he would be leaving in April 2017 after 19 years at the gallery, 12 of them as director to be director of the McMichael Canadian Art Collection in Canada. In 2020 he appeared in the television series Landscape Artist of the Year Canada as a commentator on the history of Canadian landscape art.

On 8 September the McMichael Canadian Art Collection announced that he would be retiring on 27 October 2023.(subscription required)

== Selected bibliography ==
- Rembrandt to Gainsborough: Masterpieces from Dulwich Picture Gallery. With Desmond Shawe-Taylor and Giles Waterfield. Merrell Holberton Publishers, 1999.
- Henry Moore: At the Dulwich Picture Gallery. With Ann Garrould and Anita Feldman Bennet. Scala Publishers, 2004. ISBN 978-1-85759-352-5.
- The Dutch Italianates: 17th-Century Masterpieces from Dulwich Picture Gallery, London. Philip Wilson Publishers, 2008. ISBN 978-0-85667-657-4.
- Dulwich Picture Gallery, London: Director's Choice. Scala Publishers, 2009. ISBN 978-1-85759-584-0.
- Painting Canada: Tom Thomson and the Group of Seven. London: Dulwich Picture Gallery. 2011. ISBN 978-0-856-67686-4.
- David Milne: Modern Painting. London: Philip Wilson Publishers. 2018. ISBN 978-1-781-30061-9.

Cultural offices
| Preceded by Desmond Shawe-Taylor | Director of Dulwich Picture Gallery; 2005–2017 | Succeeded by Jennifer Scott |
