= 1936 Governor General's Awards =

Canadian literary award

The 1936 Governor General's Awards for Literary Merit inaugurated Canada's annual program of Governor General's Awards, late in 1937 recognizing 1936 publications. There were only two categories, fiction and non-fiction, English language only.

The awards were presented by Lord Tweedsmuir, then Governor General of Canada—and, as John Buchan, the noted author of The Thirty-Nine Steps (1915, adapted as a 1935 film by Alfred Hitchcock).

== Winners ==
- Fiction: Bertram Brooker, Think of the Earth
- Non-fiction: Thomas Beattie Roberton, TBR: Newspaper Pieces
