= Richard Norris =

Richard Norris may refer to:

- Richard Norris (1807–1874), American locomotive engineer with Norris Locomotive Works
- Richard Norris (1922–2005), American actor, starred in Abie's Irish Rose
- Richard Norris (field hockey) (1931–2012), British Olympic field hockey player
- Richard Norris (musician) (born 1965), British music producer and musician, with The Grid
- Richard Hill Norris (1830–1916), British physiologist, spiritualist and photographer

== See also ==
- Dick Norris, Australian entomologist
