= Marc Mayer =

Canadian arts manager and curator (born 1956)

Marc Mayer CM
- Born: 1956
- Known for: curator, administrator

Marc Daniel Mayer CM (born 1956) is a Canadian arts manager and curator. He was formerly director of the National Gallery of Canada as well as the strategic adviser at the Museum of Contemporary Art Toronto.

== Early life ==
Mayer was born and raised in a Franco-Ontarian family in Sudbury, Ontario. Fully bilingual, he is also proficient in German and Italian. His mother, Madeleine, worked as a legal secretary and his father, Gilbert, worked in advertising sales for local television and radio stations. He ran as a Liberal candidate in the Nickel Belt in the 1974 federal election, and recorded comedic commentaries for CKSO-TV under the pseudonym "Marcel Mucker". Mayer's interest in art was encouraged by his uncle Réo who operated a small gallery in the basement of an army and navy store and was a hobbyist painter.

He began his university studies in the history department at Carleton University. He later transferred to McGill University. where he completed a Bachelor of Arts degree with Honours in Art History.

== Career ==
Mayer began his career in 1986 when he was named assistant to the Director and later assistant director of the 49th Parallel Centre for Contemporary Canadian Art in New York (1986-1990). He was Head of Visual Arts with the Cultural Services of the Canadian Embassy and a correspondent for the New York periodical Rizzoli’s The Journal of Art in Paris (1990-1993). Afterwards, he served as the curator of the Albright-Knox Art Gallery in Buffalo, New York (1994-1998). From 2001 to 2004, he served as the deputy director at the Brooklyn Museum in New York City and then as director of The Power Plant in Toronto (1998–2001). From 2004-2008, he served as director of the Musée d'art contemporain de Montréal (2004-2008).

Beginning in 2008, Mayer served as director and chief executive officer of the National Gallery of Canada. He fulfilled two five-year terms as director, and completed his mandate on January 18, 2019. During his tenure as director and CEO, he helped with many large-scale acquisitions such as James Hart's outdoor sculpture, The Three Watchmen and other works which he sited on Nepean Point hoping to begin a "precinct of beauty" in the capital, as well as co-curating the Jack Bush exhibition (2014), and overseeing numerous projects including the creation of the Canadian Photography Institute. He worked to increase the recognition of indigenous work and oversaw the opening of the Canadian and Indigenous Galleries in June 2017. Also that year, Mayer published Art in Canada, a book that celebrated Canadian and Canadian Indigenous artists. It was released to coincide with Canada's sesquicentennial. The book, designed by Paprika, won third prize in the Pictorial category for the 36th annual Alcuin Society Awards for Excellence in Book Design in Canada (2017).

In 2020 he appeared as a judge on Landscape Artist of the Year Canada.

Mayer was appointed to the Order of Canada in 2022, "for his contributions to fine art as an administrator and curator, both in Canada and worldwide."

In 2023, he was appointed director of Arsenal Contemporary, New York, a private gallery founded in Montreal to promote Canadian contemporary art.

== Controversy ==
Mayer`s final year at the National Gallery of Canada was overshadowed by controversy - the cancelled sale of a Marc Chagall painting, The Eiffel Tower (1929) which the National Gallery wanted to sell to buy a Jacques-Louis David painting, Saint Jerome Hears the Trumpet of the Last Judgment (1779) owned by a Quebec City church. However, the Quebec government closed down the idea since two Quebec museums said they wanted to buy the David. For now, it is on exhibit at the Montreal Museum of Fine Arts.

== Personal life ==
Mayer lives on a farm in Delaware County, New York.
