= Kathleen Munn =

Canadian modern painter

- Born: Kathleen Jean Munn; August 28, 1887; Toronto, Ontario
- Died: October 19, 1974 (aged 87); Toronto, Ontario
- Education: Westbourne School, Toronto with Farquhar McGillivray Knowles (1904); Art Students League in New York City and ASL summer school in Woodstock, New York (1912-late 1920s); Philadelphia Academy of Fine Arts

Kathleen Jean Munn (1887– October 19, 1974) is recognized today as a pioneer of modern art in Canada, though she remained on the periphery of the Canadian art scene during her lifetime. She imagined conventional subjects in a radically new visual vocabulary as she combined the traditions of European art with modern art studies in New York. She stopped painting about 1939 and when she died in 1974 at age 87, she was unaware that her long-held hope for "a possible future for my work" was about to become reality.

== Early years ==
Kathleen Jean Munn was born to a middle-class family in Toronto in 1887 and was the youngest of six children. Her family owned and ran a jewellery store at the intersection of Yonge and Bloor, and the family lived in the apartment above. Munn began her formal art education in 1904 when she began attending the Westbourne School in Toronto, studying under Farquhar McGillivray Knowles. Beginning in 1909, she began to show her work in exhibitions with the Ontario Society of Artists, the Royal Canadian Academy of Arts, and the Canadian National Exhibition.

In 1912, Munn left her native Toronto to begin her studies at the Art Students League in New York City, studying with A. S. Baylinson, Andrew Dasburg and Max Weber, students of Cubism derived from Cézanne. Weber had a powerful influence on her as an artist and a notebook she kept from her time at the League, records quotations from Claude Bragdon, who was an influence on Weber.

Munn's family was extremely supportive of her career and paid for her art education in both New York and Philadelphia. She developed a devotion to international modernism and by 1920 "her style had evolved from the loose colourful brushwork of Impressionism to the more hard-edge geometric fragmentation of natural form". This resulted from her study of the French artist Paul Cézanne.

== Philosophy of art ==
Munn kept extensive notebooks of her studies at the Art Students League, which continued on and off until the late 1920s. She read constantly and kept extensive notes on art theory, philosophy, literature, and music, including Synchromism, Cubism, and Theosophy, embracing an intellectual and spiritual approach to art. She was influenced by the writings of Jay Hambidge and his theory of dynamic symmetry, which was instrumental in the development of her Passion Series.

== Later success ==
Munn sought to convey spiritual truths within a formal order "like her colleague and admirer Lawren Harris". She was invited to contribute to the 1928 Group of Seven exhibition and submitted her work Composition. The painting was purchased later on by Bertram Brooker who praised it for its "musicality".

In her day, most Toronto art critics were not sure of her pioneering innovations. However she was noted as "one of the ablest...of women painters and one of the most advanced". Frederick Housser wrote that Munn was "probably the only painter in Canada whose canvases show an interest in cubism", which did not suit the popular styles of painting in Toronto at the time she was practicing and exhibiting. He also said "More attention might be paid to her if she exhibited in New York or Paris, instead of Canada, where public appreciation of this kind of painting is as yet undeveloped ..."

Munn died on in Toronto, Ontario at 87 years of age.

In 2011, Cassandra Getty for the Art Gallery of Windsor organized an exhibition of Munn's work which travelled to the Art Gallery of Ontario where it was titled The Passion of Kathleen Munn. In Toronto, the show of around 40 paintings and works on paper was supplemented with related drawings and collages from her archives which revealed her working process.

== Collections ==
Munn's work is included in the collections of the Art Gallery of Ontario and the National Gallery of Canada.
