= Thomas Beattie Roberton =

Canadian journalist

- Born: 1879; Glasgow, Scotland, UK
- Died: 1936 (aged 56–57); Winnipeg, Manitoba, Canada
- Occupations: journalist, critic
- Writing career
- Period: 1910s-1930s
- Notable work: TBR: Newspaper Pieces

Thomas Beattie Roberton (1879 – 1936) was a Scottish-born Canadian journalist. A columnist and critic for the Winnipeg Free Press from 1918 until his death in 1936, he won the inaugural Governor General's Award for English-language non-fiction at the 1936 Governor General's Awards for his essay collection TBR: Newspaper Pieces.

He wrote on a variety of topics, most commonly literary and jazz reviews but also sometimes expanding into political commentary.
