= Lionel LeMoine FitzGerald =

Canadian artist and art educator

LeMoine FitzGerald
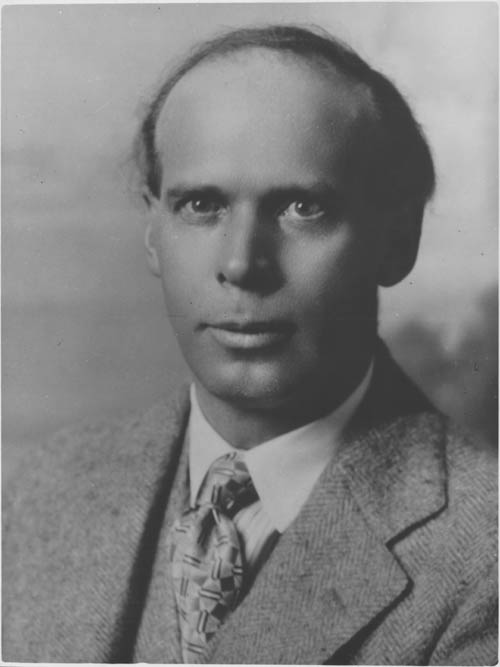
- FitzGerald, photographed by M.O. Hammond in 1930
- Born: Lionel LeMoine FitzGerald; March 17, 1890; Winnipeg, Manitoba, Canada
- Died: August 5, 1956 (aged 66); Winnipeg, Manitoba, Canada
- Known for: Painter
- Spouse: Felicia Wright (1883–1962) (married 1912)

Lionel LeMoine FitzGerald L.L. D. also known as L. L. FitzGerald (March 17, 1890 – August 5, 1956) was a Canadian artist and art educator. He was the only member of the Group of Seven based in western Canada. He worked almost exclusively in Manitoba. Although he accepted the Group of Seven's invitation to become a member in 1932, FitzGerald was less concerned than the rest of the group with the promotion of a unified Canadian identity. Instead he explored his surroundings, delving deeply into the forces he felt animated and united nature in order to make "the picture a living thing".

His landscapes and still lifes were drawn from his immediate surroundings—the view of the back lane outside his house; a potted plant on the windowsill. His style grew more spare and abstract over his career. His body work includes painting in oil and watercolour, drawing, printmaking and sculpture.

== Career ==
L. L. FitzGerald was born in Winnipeg on March 17, 1890, to Lionel Henry FitzGerald and Belle (Hicks) FitzGerald. His father, L. H. FitzGerald, was of Irish descent, born in the West Indies and raised in Quebec. He was employed as a bank messenger and sometimes dealt in real estate.

His mother's family had left Devonshire for Canada, eventually settling on a farm in the Pembina Hills near Snowflake, Manitoba. As a boy, FitzGerald spent the summer vacation months on his grandmother's farm where he and his older brother were free to explore the woods and prairies. A teacher introduced him to the masterworks through Perry Picture reproductions, and he also took pleasure in drawing exercises from popular art coursebooks.

FitzGerald left school at 14, with a Grade Eight education. This was not unusual at that time for families who did not expect to send their child to university. He worked first as an office boy, then was employed as a clerk for various businesses. He found it was not how he wanted to spend his life, saying

After leaving school I worked in a wholesale drug office and finding the job not quite satisfying I felt the first real urge to draw so I got some drawing paper, a pencil and eraser and started work. I had liked the drawing period at school and had learned a little of how to begin working, meagre as it was. One of the first efforts, out of doors, was the drawing of a large elm tree and I remember a friend and I making great preparations and walking a long distance to find a subject that appealed to us. I think, perhaps the walk into the country held as much fascination for us as the work.

In his spare time, FitzGerald began to draw and paint regularly. He used John Ruskin's Elements of Drawing (1857) as a guide for his self-directed study. He signed up for a winter of evening classes at the A. S. Kesthelyi School of Fine Art. He remarked in later years that "I am still wondering how it was possible to find out so much in so short a time".'

In 1912, FitzGerald eloped with trained soprano Felicia Wright (1883–1962). They had two children: a son Edward in 1915, and a daughter Patricia in 1919.

After their marriage, FitzGerald determined to work as an artist while taking on a variety of jobs to support himself and his family. He arranged window displays, did free-lance interior decorating and painted theatre backdrops. His artistic work met with some success. In 1913, he exhibited at the Royal Canadian Academy. In 1915, FitzGerald began applying Impressionist concepts to his work, adopting broken dabs of colour to suggest form, depth and the intense atmospheric light typical of the prairies. In 1918, his painting, Late Fall, Manitoba was purchased by the National Gallery of Canada and in 1921 he received his first solo exhibition, at the Winnipeg Art Gallery. He spent the winter of 1921–1922 at the Art Students League of New York in New York City and developed what would become his mature, Precisionist style.

In 1929, in the chaos of the Wall Street crash of 1929, FitzGerald became the principal of the Winnipeg School of Art. The position inspired him to travel more widely, researching programs throughout North America. He was particularly struck by the works of Paul Cézanne, which had just been donated to the Museum of Modern Art in the Havemeyer bequest.

In 1930, FitzGerald exhibited his work with the Group of Seven in two shows. The Group of Seven invited him to join their group in 1932, after the death of J. E. H. MacDonald. He was chosen unanimously, but only exhibited as a member once before they disbanded and reformed as the Canadian Group of Painters, of which he was a founding member.

His most significant work, Doc Snyder's House, was completed in 1931. FitzGerald worked slowly and meticulously, always seeking balance between the geometry and natural elements of his work. Doc Snyder, in particular "represents two winters, including two full weeks each Christmas vacation as well as all weekends." He always sought to create harmonious, unified canvases. For FitzGerald, the formal relationships between lines, colours, and shapes were more important to the life of the paintings than subject matter. Its realistic shading of the tree trunks and quiet nature is indicative of his training in New York.

It seems impossible for the artist to attain any height without sacrificing at least a little of the ordinary necessities, not to mention the loss of ordinary social contact, that are so essential to others. The desire to create something. fills the artist's mind, and to do this requires time for active work and quiet thought

In 1947, FitzGerald took a leave of absence from his responsibilities as director at the Winnipeg School of Art. With time to concentrate on his artwork, the fifty‒seven‒year‒old painted some of the masterpieces of his career such as The Little Plant (1947, McMichael Canadian Art Collection). As Michael Parke-Taylor writes, this work set the direction for a "series of subtle still‒lifes that are among his best works from the later forties and chart a path to greater abstraction".

By 1950, he was using abstracted compositions and by 1954, he was making abstractions such as Untitled (Abstract Green and Gold) (Winnipeg Art Gallery). However, the art of his latter years always was to vary between abstraction and figuration.

== Death ==
FitzGerald died in Winnipeg of a heart attack on August 5, 1956. His ashes were spread in a field in Snowflake, Manitoba.

== Teaching ==
In 1924, FitzGerald began teaching at the Winnipeg School of Art. He was promoted to principal of the school in 1929, a position he held until 1947.

== Honours ==
The University of Manitoba recognized FitzGerald's contributions with an honorary doctorate in 1952 (L.L.D.). The Winnipeg School of Art was renamed the School of Art when it affiliated with the University of Manitoba in 1950.

In 2003, the Royal Canadian Mint produced a gold coin based on FitzGerald's 1929 work Houses.

In 2004, FitzGerald was inducted into the Winnipeg Citizens Hall of Fame for his contributions to the arts. He is a "Memorable Manitoban".

== Record sale prices ==
At the Cowley Abbott Auction, An Important Private Collection, fall 2023, FitzGerald's Still Life with Plant (1948), oil on canvas mounted on board, 19.75 x 14 ins ( 50.2 x 35.6 cm ), Auction Estimate: $15,000.00 – $25,000.00 realized a price of $168,000.00 CAD. At the same auction house, in the Spring Live Auction of Important Canadian Art (2024), Untitled (Broken Tree in Landscape), oil on canvas, 14 × 17 in ( 35.6 x 43.2 cm ), Auction Estimate: $30,000.00 – $40,000.00, realized a price of $168,000.00.
