= Nathalie Bondil =

Canadian art historian

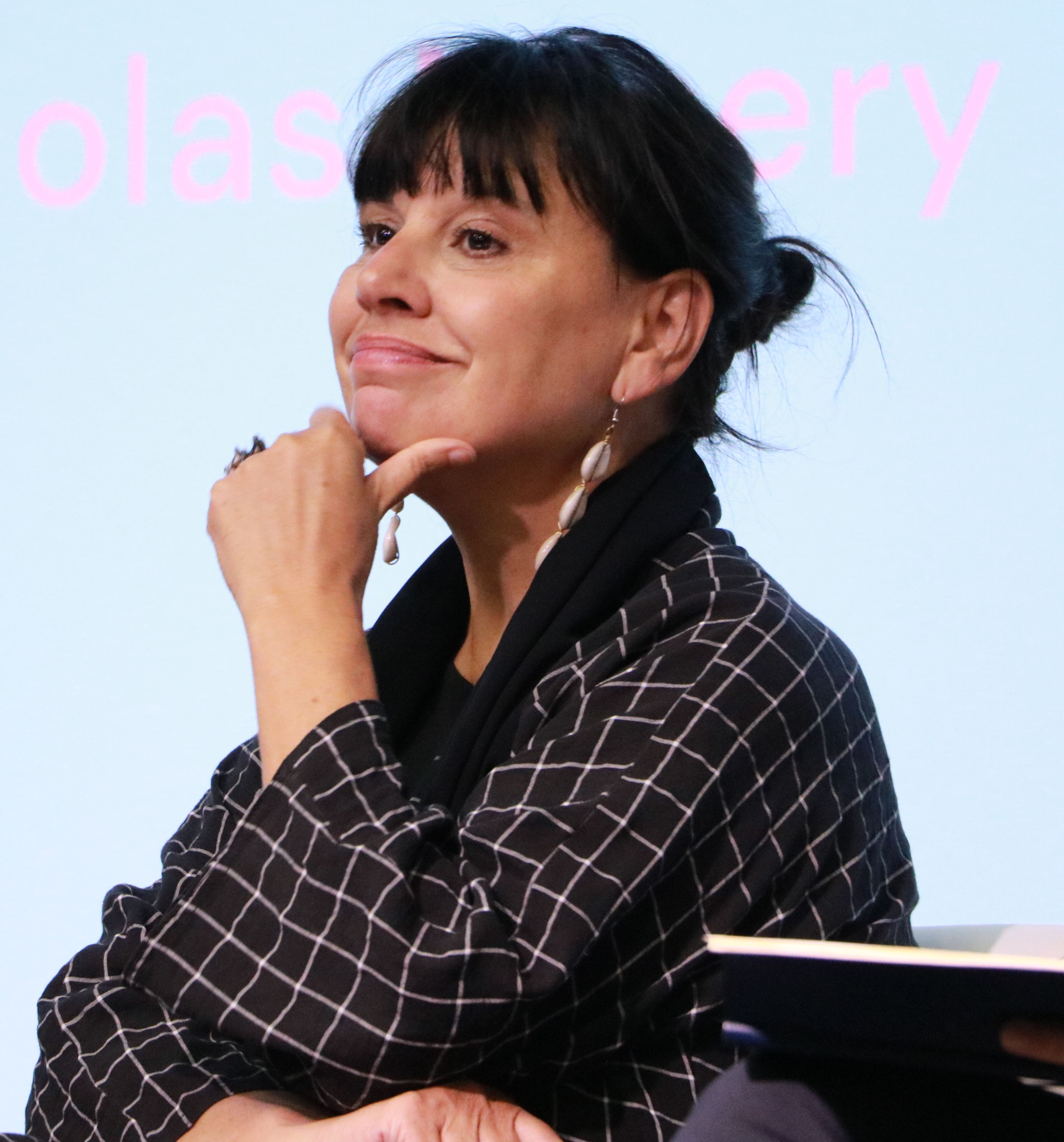
- Born: February 19, 1967 (age 59)
- Citizenship: French and Canadian
- Occupations: Art historian and curator
- Honours: Officier de l'Ordre des Arts et des Lettres (2016), Member of the Order of Canada (2015), Chevalier de l'Ordre national du Québec (2011)

Nathalie Bondil CM is a French and Canadian art historian and curator. She served as director general and chief curator of the Montreal Museum of Fine Arts from 2007 to 2020. Bondil joined the museum in 1999 and is the first woman to be the museum's director. In 2019, she was awarded the Legion of Honour.

== Biography ==
Nathalie Bondil holds a degree in art history from the École du Louvre. She successfully passed the entry examination for the École nationale du Patrimoine de Paris in 1994, then graduated in 1996, thereby becoming Conservateur du patrimoine d'État.

From 1996 to 1998, she worked at the Musée National des Monuments Français (which now forms part of the Cité de l'architecture et du patrimoine) as curator in charge of museography for the galleries dedicated to the 17th to 20th centuries, as part of the museum's renovation.

In 1999, she was hired as curator for European art from 1800 to 1945, and in 2000, promoted to chief curator, taking charge of the Curatorial Department, Conservation, the Library, Archives, Publishing and Exhibitions at the Montreal Museum of Fine Arts. She was the Director of the Montreal Museum of Fine Arts from 2007 to July 2020.

In July 2020 Bondil was fired by the museum's chairman of the board, Michel de la Chennelière. The dismissal was controversial in the art community, and the museum reached a settlement with Bondil in 2022 after she filed suit for unfair dismissal and libel.
