= List of guests at the coronation of Elizabeth II =

The following is a list of guests at the coronation of Elizabeth II, which took place on 2 June 1953.

== Family of Queen Elizabeth II ==
=== British royal family ===
- The Duke of Edinburgh, the Queen's husband
  - The Duke of Cornwall, the Queen's son and heir
- Queen Elizabeth the Queen Mother, the Queen's mother
  - The Princess Margaret, the Queen's sister
- The Princess Royal, the Queen's paternal aunt
  - The Earl and Countess of Harewood, the Queen's first cousin and his wife
  - The Hon. Gerald Lascelles, the Queen's first cousin
- The Duke and Duchess of Gloucester, the Queen's paternal uncle and aunt
  - Prince William of Gloucester, the Queen's first cousin
  - Prince Richard of Gloucester, the Queen's first cousin
- The Duchess of Kent, the Queen's paternal aunt by marriage (also the Duke of Edinburgh's first cousin)
  - The Duke of Kent, the Queen's first cousin
  - Princess Alexandra of Kent, the Queen's first cousin
  - Prince Michael of Kent, the Queen's first cousin
- Princess Marie Louise, the Queen's first cousin twice removed
- Lady Patricia and The Hon. Sir Alexander Ramsay, the Queen's first cousin twice removed and her husband
  - Alexander Ramsay, the Queen's second cousin once removed
- The Earl of Athlone and Princess Alice, Countess of Athlone, the Queen's paternal great-uncle and great-aunt (also the Queen's first cousin twice removed)
  - Lady May and Sir Henry Abel Smith, the Queen's first cousin once removed and her husband
    - Richard Abel Smith, the Queen's second cousin

=== Bowes-Lyon family ===
- Albemarle Bowes-Lyon, the Queen's first cousin
- Simon Bowes-Lyon, the Queen's first cousin
- The Hon. Mrs Andrew Elphinstone, wife of the Queen's first cousin
- James Bowes-Lyon, the Queen's first cousin once removed

=== Teck-Cambridge family ===
- The Marquess and Marchioness of Cambridge, the Queen's first cousin once removed and his wife
  - Lady Mary and Peter Whitley, the Queen's second cousin and her husband
- The Duchess and Duke of Beaufort, the Queen's first cousin once removed and her husband
- Lady Helena Gibbs, the Queen's first cousin once removed

=== The Duke of Edinburgh's family ===
==== Greek royal family ====
- (Kingdom of Greece) Princess Andrew of Greece and Denmark, the Duke of Edinburgh's mother
  - The Princess and Prince of Hohenlohe-Langenburg, the Duke of Edinburgh's sister and brother-in-law
    - Princess Beatrix of Hohenlohe-Langenburg, the Duke of Edinburgh's niece
  - The Margravine and Margrave of Baden, the Duke of Edinburgh's sister and brother-in-law
    - The Hereditary Prince of Baden, the Duke of Edinburgh's nephew
  - Princess and Prince George William of Hanover, the Duke of Edinburgh's sister and brother-in-law
    - Princess Christina of Hesse, the Duke of Edinburgh's niece
- (Kingdom of Greece) Prince and Princess George of Greece and Denmark, the Duke of Edinburgh's paternal uncle and aunt (representing his nephew, the King of the Hellenes)
  - The Duchess and Duke of Castel Duino, the Duke of Edinburgh's first cousin and her husband
- Princess Irene, Duchess of Aosta, the Duke of Edinburgh's paternal first cousin

==== Mountbatten family ====
- The Marquess of Milford Haven, the Duke of Edinburgh's first cousin
- The Earl and Countess Mountbatten of Burma, the Duke of Edinburgh's maternal uncle and aunt
  - The Lady and Lord Brabourne, the Duke of Edinburgh's first cousin and her husband
  - Lady Pamela Mountbatten, the Duke of Edinburgh's first cousin
- The Marchioness of Carisbrooke, wife of the Queen's first cousin twice removed (also wife of the Duke of Edinburgh's first cousin once removed)

== Rulers of British protectorates ==
- Sheikh Salman bin Hamad Al Khalifa I of Bahrain
- Sheikh Abdullah III Al-Salim Al-Sabah of Kuwait
- Sheikh Ahmad bin Ali Al Thani (representing his father, the Emir of Qatar)
- (Emirate of Abu Dhabi) Sheikh Shakhbut bin Sultan Al Nahyan of Abu Dhabi
- Sultan Omar Ali Saifuddien III of Brunei
- Sultan Ibrahim IV of Kelantan
- Sultan Hisamuddin and Raja Jemaah of Selangor
- Sultan Ibrahim and the Sultanah of Johor
- (Sultanate of Zanzibar) Sultan Khalifa bin Harubn and the Sultanah Nunu of Zanzibar
- (Sultanate of Lahej) Sultan Ali III ibn 'Abd al-Karim al-'Abdali of Lahej
- Sultan Yusuf Izzuddin Shah of Perak
- Queen Sālote Tupou III of Tonga

== Members of foreign royal families ==
- The Crown Prince and Crown Princess of Norway, the Queen's first cousin once removed and his wife (also the Queen's second cousin once removed) and the Duke of Edinburgh's second cousins (representing the Crown Prince's father, the King of Norway)
  - Princess Astrid of Norway, the Queen's second cousin and the Duke of Edinburgh's second cousin once removed
- Prince and Princess Axel of Denmark, the Queen's first cousin twice removed and second cousin once removed (also the Duke of Edinburgh's first cousin once removed and second cousin) (representing Prince Axel's first cousin once removed, the King of Denmark)
- The Duke of Halland, the Queen's second cousin once removed (representing his father, the King of Sweden)
- (Belgium) The Prince of Liège, the Queen's third cousin (representing his brother, the King of the Belgians)
- The Hereditary Grand Duke and Hereditary Grand Duchess of Luxembourg, the Queen's fourth cousin and third cousin (representing his mother, the Grand Duchess of Luxembourg)
- The Prince Consort of the Netherlands (representing his wife, the Queen of the Netherlands)
- (Kingdom of Laos) The Crown Prince of Laos (representing his father, the King of Laos)
- (Kingdom of Nepal) Prince Himalaya and Princess Princep of Nepal (representing his father, King Tribhuvan of Nepal)
- The Hereditary Prince of Vietnam (representing his father Bảo Đại, the Chief of State of Vietnam)
- The Crown Prince of Japan (representing his father, the Emperor of Japan)
- (Ethiopian Empire) The Crown Prince of Ethiopia (representing his father, the Emperor of Ethiopia)
- Prince Fahd bin Abdulaziz Al Saud (representing his father, the King of Saudi Arabia)
- (Kingdom of Afghanistan) Shah Wali Khan (representing his nephew, the King of Afghanistan)
- (Kingdom of Iraq) The Crown Prince of Iraq (representing his nephew, the King of Iraq)
- Prince Sisowath Monireth (representing his nephew, the King of Cambodia)
- Prince and Princess Chula Chakrabongse (representing his first cousin, the King of Thailand)
- Prince Saif Al Islam Al Hassan, Prime Minister of the Mutawakkilite Kingdom of Yemen (representing his brother, the King of Yemen)
- (Kingdom of Egypt) The Nabil Suleyman Daoud and The Nabila Adila Daoud (representing the King of Egypt)
- Prince Karl Alfred and Princess Agnes of Liechtenstein (representing his brother, the Prince of Liechtenstein)
- Prince Pierre of Monaco (representing his son, the Prince of Monaco)

== Commonwealth heads of government ==
- Robert Menzies, Prime Minister of Australia, and Pattie Menzies
- Louis St. Laurent, Prime Minister of Canada, and Jeanne St. Laurent
- (Dominion of Ceylon) Dudley Senanayake, Prime Minister of Ceylon
- Jawaharlal Nehru, Prime Minister of India, and Indira Gandhi
- George Borg Olivier, Prime Minister of Malta, and Alexandra Borg Olivier
- Sidney Holland, Prime Minister of New Zealand, and Florence Holland
- The Viscount Brookeborough, Prime Minister of Northern Ireland, and The Viscountess Brookeborough
- Mohammad Ali Bogra, Prime Minister of Pakistan
- Sir Godfrey Huggins, Prime Minister of Southern Rhodesia, and Lady Huggins
- (Union of South Africa) D. F. Malan, Prime Minister of South Africa, and Maria Malan
- Winston Churchill, Prime Minister of the United Kingdom, and Clementine Churchill

== Representatives of British colonies ==
- Sir Robert George Howe, Governor-General of Anglo-Egyptian Sudan

== Representatives of foreign countries ==
=== Foreign ministers ===
- Karl Gruber, Minister of Foreign Affairs of Austria
- Agus Salim, former Minister of Foreign Affairs of Indonesia
- Alfred Naqqache, Minister of Foreign Affairs of Lebanon
- Paulo Cunha, Minister of Foreign Affairs of Portugal
- (Ba'athist Syria) Zafer Rifai, Minister of Foreign Affairs of Syria
- Fructuoso Pittaluga, Minister of Foreign Affairs of Uruguay
- Aureliano Otáñez, Minister of Foreign Affairs of Venezuela
- (Socialist Federal Republic of Yugoslavia) Koča Popović, Minister of Foreign Affairs of Yugoslavia

=== Diplomats ===
- Nayden Nikolov, Minister Plenipotentiary of Bulgaria to the United Kingdom
- Roberto Quesada Jiménez, Minister Plenipotentiary of Costa Rica to the United Kingdom
- Enrique Balmaceda, Ambassador of Chile to the United Kingdom
- Carlos Saladrigas Zayas, Ambassador of Cuba to the United Kingdom
- Josef Ullrich, Ambassador of Czechoslovakia to the United Kingdom
- Tiburcio Carías Castillo, Ambassador of Honduras to the United Nations
- Imre Horváth, Ambassador of Hungary to the United Kingdom
- Agnar Klemens Jónsson, Ambassador of Iceland to the United Kingdom
- Eliahu Eilat, Ambassador of Israel to the United Kingdom
- Pedro Godinot de Vilaire, Ambassador of Paraguay to the United Kingdom
- Eugeniusz Milnikiel, Ambassador of Poland to the United Kingdom
- Pavel Babuci, Ambassador of Romania to the United Kingdom
- Boris Lifschitz, Consul-General of San Marino
- Henry de Torrenté, Ambassador of Switzerland to the United Kingdom

=== Other representatives ===
- (Argentina) Rear-Admiral Alberto Teisaire, Provisional President of the Argentine Senate
- Hernán Siles Zuazo, Vice President of Bolivia
- (Brazil) Mascarenhas de Morais, Chief of Staff of the Brazilian Armed Forces
- Luis Ignacio Andrade, Minister of Government of Colombia
- Brigadier-General Manuel de Moya Alonzo of the Dominican Republic
- Carlos Julio Arosemena Monroy, Minister of Defence of Ecuador
- Carlos Guirola of El Salvador
- Urho Kekkonen, Prime Minister of Finland
- Franz Blücher, Vice Chancellor of West Germany
- (Guatemala) Colonel Carlos Enrique Díaz de León, Chief of the Guatemalan Armed Forces
- Paik Too-chin, Prime Minister of South Korea
- William Tolbert, Vice President of Liberia
- Francisco A. de Icaza of Mexico
- Colonel Anastasio Somoza Debayle, Chief of Staff of the National Guard of Nicaragua
- Ricardo Arias, Second Vice President of Panama
- Héctor Boza, First Vice President of Peru
- Joaquín Miguel Elizalde, Secretary of Foreign Affairs of the Philippines
- Admiral Salvador Moreno Fernández, Minister of the Navy of Spain
- Sheikh Al-Zubair al-Malik (representing the Dongola of Sudan)
- Adnan Menderes, Prime Minister of Turkey
- General George C. Marshall (representing the President of the United States of America)
  - (United States) General Omar Bradley, Chairman of the Joint Chiefs of Staff
  - (United States) Earl Warren, Governor of California
  - (United States) Fleur Cowles, writer and artist
- (Socialist Federal Republic of Yugoslavia) Milovan Djilas, Deputy Prime Minister of Yugoslavia
  - (Socialist Federal Republic of Yugoslavia) Colonel General Peko Dapčević, Chief of the General Staff of the Yugoslavia
