= Margaret Oldenburg =

Margaret Oldenburg may refer to:

- Margaret of Denmark, Queen of Scotland (1456–1486), daughter of King Christian I of Denmark and the wife of King James III of Scotland
- Princess Margaret of Denmark (1895–1992), granddaughter of King Christian IX of Denmark and the wife of Prince René of Bourbon-Parma
- Princess Margarita of Greece and Denmark (1905–1981), eldest child and daughter of Prince Andrew of Greece and Denmark and Princess Alice of Battenberg
