= Prince Andrew of Greece and Denmark =

Prince of Greece and Denmark (1882–1944)

Prince Andrew
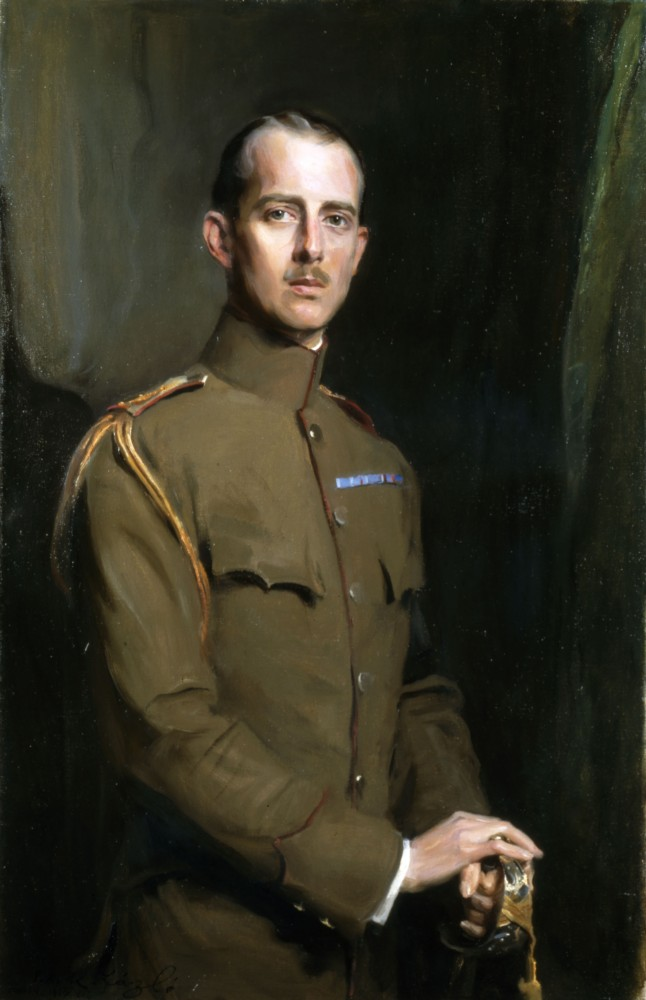
- Portrait by Philip de László, 1913
- Born: 2 February 1882; Tatoi Palace, Athens, Greece
- Died: 3 December 1944 (aged 62); Hotel Metropole, Monte Carlo, Monaco
- Burial: Royal Cemetery, Tatoi Palace, Athens
- Spouse: Princess Alice of Battenberg (m. 1903)
- Issue: Margarita, Princess of Hohenlohe-Langenburg; Theodora, Margravine of Baden; Cecilie, Hereditary Grand Duchess of Hesse and by Rhine; Sophie, Princess George of Hanover; Prince Philip, Duke of Edinburgh
- House: Glücksburg
- Father: George I of Greece
- Mother: Olga Constantinovna of Russia
- Military career
- Allegiance: Kingdom of Greece
- Branch: Hellenic Army
- Service years: 1901–1909; 1912–1917; 1920–1922
- Rank: Major General
- Commands: V Army Corps; II Army Corps
- Conflicts: Balkan Wars; Greco-Turkish War; Battle of the Sakarya

Prince Andrew of Greece and Denmark (Greek: Ανδρέας, romanized: Andréas; 2 February [O.S. 21 January] 1882 – 3 December 1944) was the seventh child and fourth son of King George I and Queen Olga of Greece. He was a grandson of King Christian IX of Denmark and the father of Prince Philip, Duke of Edinburgh. He was a prince of Greece and Denmark, both by virtue of his patrilineal descent.

A career soldier, Andrew began military training at an early age and was commissioned as an officer in the Greek army. His command positions were substantive appointments rather than honorary, and he saw service in the Balkan Wars. In 1913, his father was assassinated and Andrew's elder brother Constantine became king. Constantine's neutrality policy during World War I led to his abdication, and most of the royal family, including Andrew, was exiled. On their return a few years later, Andrew saw service as Major General in the Greco-Turkish War (1919–1922), but the war went badly for Greece and Andrew was blamed, in part, for the loss of Greek territory. He was exiled for a second time in 1922 and spent most of the rest of his life in France.

By 1930, Andrew was estranged from his wife, Princess Alice of Battenberg. His only son, Philip, served in the British navy during World War II, while all four of his daughters were married to Germans, three of whom had Nazi connections. Separated from his wife and son by the effects of the war, Andrew died in Monte Carlo in 1944. He had seen neither of them since 1939.

== Early life ==
Andrew was born on 2 February 1882 at the Tatoi Palace, north of Athens. He was the fourth son of George I of Greece and Olga Constantinovna of Russia. A member of the House of Schleswig-Holstein-Sonderburg-Glücksburg, he held the title of prince in both Greece and Denmark, as his father was a younger son of Christian IX of Denmark. He was in the line of succession to the Greek throne.

In addition to his native Greek, Andrew learnt Danish, German, French, English, and Russian. In conversations with his parents he refused to speak anything but Greek. He attended cadet school and staff college at Athens, and received private tuition in military subjects from Panagiotis Danglis, who recorded that he was "quick and intelligent". He "became quite friendly" with fellow student Theodore Pangalos, the future Greek dictator.

Despite his near-sightedness, Andrew joined the army as a cavalry officer in May 1901.

== Marriage ==
In 1902, Andrew met Princess Alice of Battenberg during his stay in London for the coronation of Edward VII, who was his uncle-by-marriage and her grand-uncle. Alice was a daughter of Prince Louis of Battenberg and Princess Victoria of Hesse and by Rhine, King Edward's niece. They fell in love, and on 6 October 1903, Andrew married Alice in a civil ceremony in Darmstadt. The following day, two religious services were held: one Lutheran in the Evangelical Castle Church, and another Greek Orthodox in the Russian Chapel on the Mathildenhöhe. Andrew and Alice had five children: Margarita, Theodora, Cecilie, Sophie, and Philip.

== Early career ==
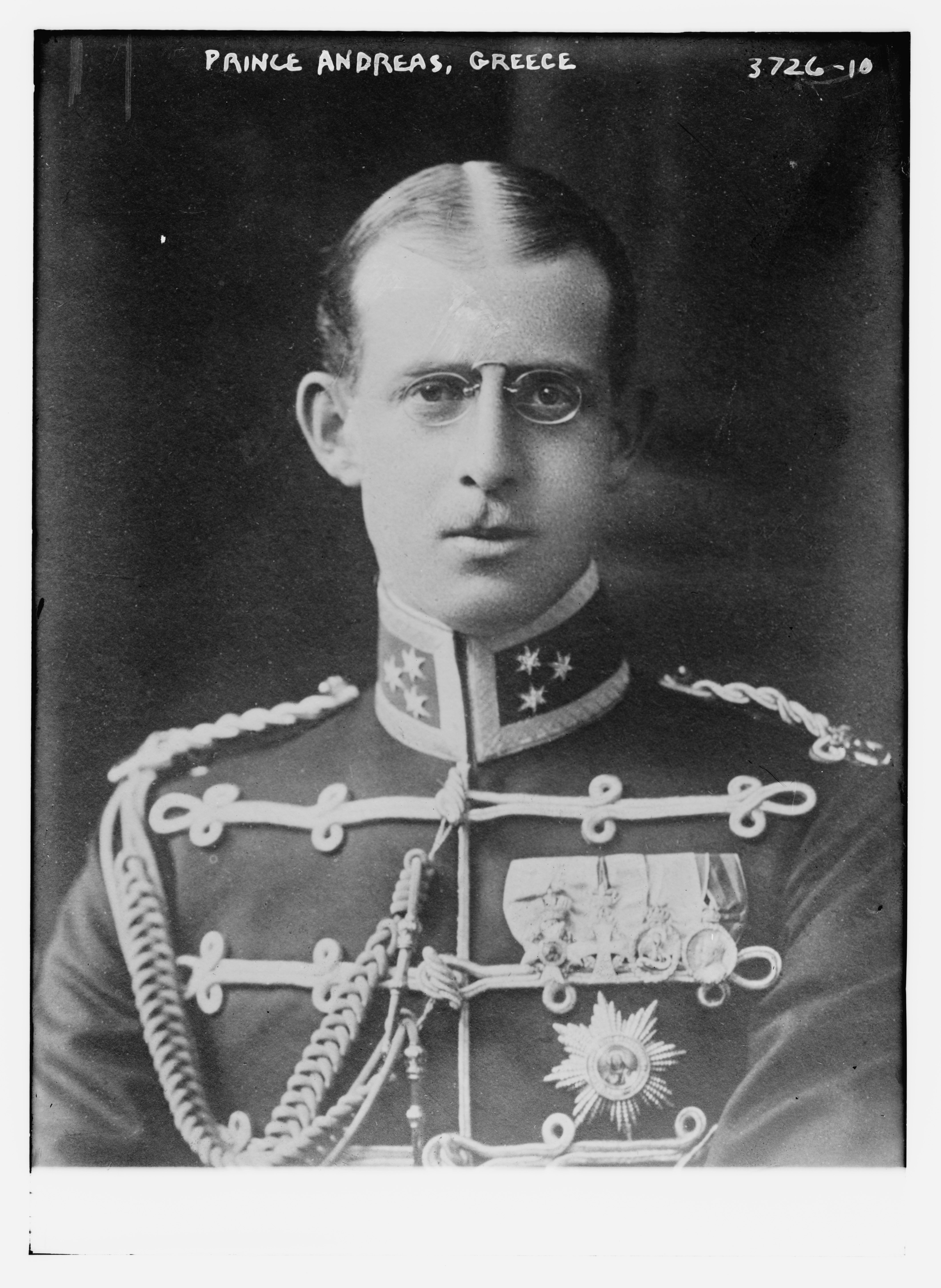
Andrew, c. 1910

In 1909, the political situation in Greece led to a coup d'état, as the Athens government refused to support the Cretan parliament, which had called for the union of Crete, still nominally part of the Ottoman Empire, with the Greek mainland. A group of dissatisfied officers formed a Greek nationalist Military League and demanded, among other reforms, the removal of royal princes from the army, which led to Andrew's resignation and the rise to power of Eleftherios Venizelos. A few years later, at the outbreak of the Balkan Wars in 1912, Andrew was reinstated in the army as a lieutenant colonel in the 3rd Cavalry Regiment, and placed in command of a field hospital. During the war, his father was assassinated and Andrew inherited a villa on the island of Corfu, Mon Repos, as well as an annuity of £4,000. In 1914, Andrew, like many European princes, held honorary military posts in both the German and Russian empires, as well as Prussian, Russian, Danish and Italian knighthoods.

During World War I, Andrew continued to visit Britain, despite veiled accusations in the British House of Commons that he was a German agent. His brother, King Constantine, who was the Kaiser's brother-in-law, followed a neutrality policy, but the democratically elected government of Venizelos supported the Allies. By June 1917, the King's neutrality policy had become so untenable that he abdicated and the Greek royal family were forced into exile. For the next few years, most of the Greek royal family lived in Switzerland.

== Exile from Greece ==
For three years, Constantine's second son, Alexander, was king of Greece, until his early death from an infection due to a monkey bite. Constantine was restored to the throne, and Andrew was once again reinstated in the army, this time as a major-general. The family took up residence at Mon Repos.

Andrew was given command of the II Army Corps during the Battle of the Sakarya, which effectively halted the Greek advance in the Greco-Turkish War (1919–1922). Andrew had little respect for his superior officers, whom he considered incompetent. He was ordered to attack the Turkish positions, which he considered a desperate move little short "of ill-concealed panic". Refusing to put his men in undue danger, suffering lack of food and ammunition, Andrew followed his own battle plan, to the dismay of the commanding general, Anastasios Papoulas. Relieved of his chief of staff, and given a dressing-down by Papoulas, in September Andrew asked to be removed from command, but Papoulas refused. Andrew's troops were forced to retreat. He was placed on leave for two months, until he was transferred to the Supreme Army Council. In March 1922, he was appointed commander of the V Army Corps in Epirus and the Ionian Islands. Papoulas was replaced by General Georgios Hatzianestis.

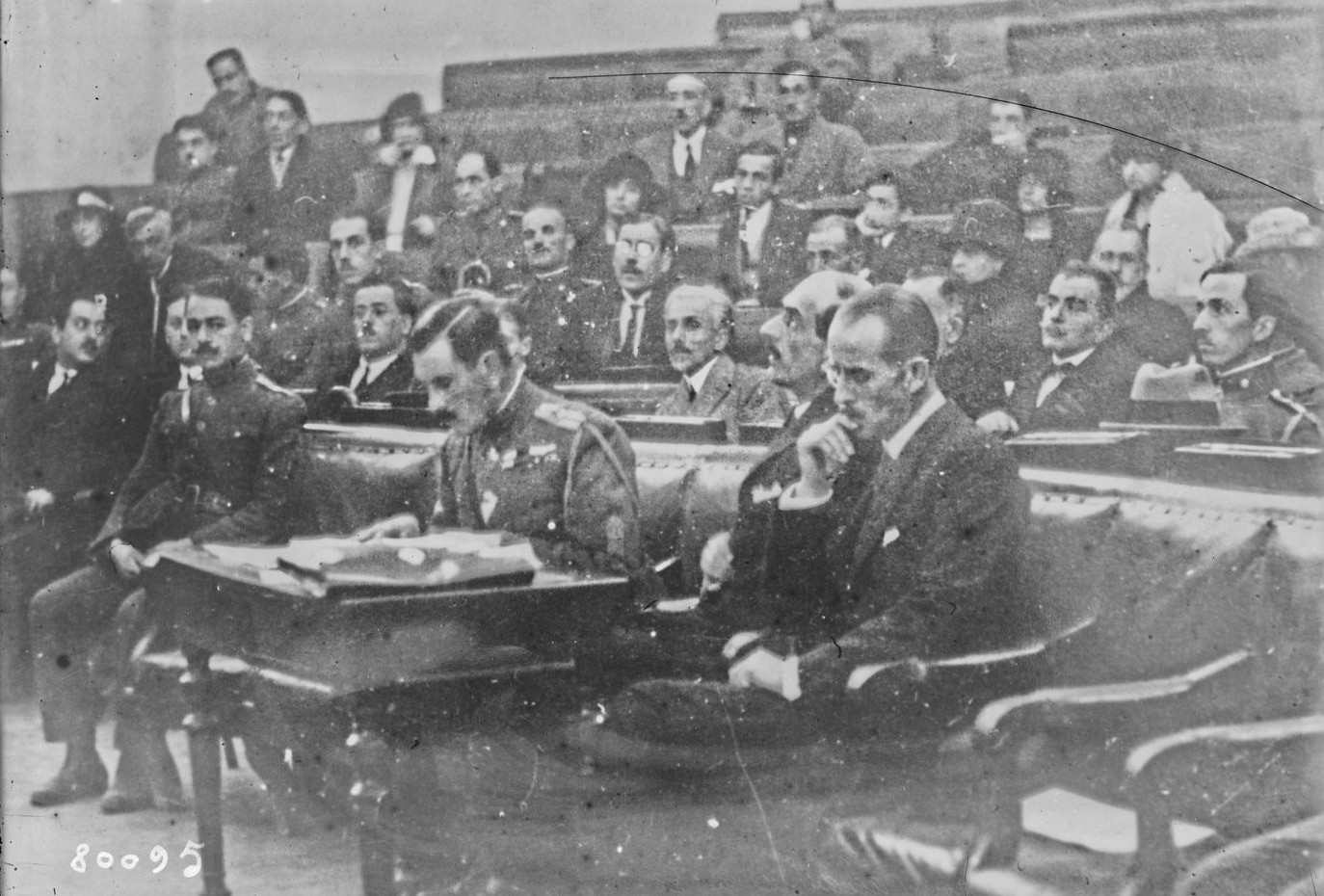
Andrew (first from the right) on trial in 1922

The Greek defeat in Asia Minor in August 1922 led to the 11 September 1922 Revolution, during which Andrew was arrested, court-martialed, and found guilty of "disobeying an order" and "acting on his own initiative" during the battle of the previous year. Many defendants in the treason trials that followed the coup were shot, including Hatzianestis and five senior politicians. British diplomats assumed that Andrew was also in mortal danger. Andrew, though spared, was banished for life and his family fled into exile aboard a British cruiser, HMS Calypso. The family settled at Saint-Cloud, on the outskirts of Paris, in a small house lent to them by Andrew's wealthy sister-in-law, Princess George of Greece. He and his family were stripped of their Greek nationality and travelled under Danish passports.

In 1930, Andrew published Towards Disaster: The Greek Army in Asia Minor in 1921, in which he defended his actions during the Battle of the Sakarya, but he essentially lived a life of enforced retirement, despite only being in his forties. During their time in exile the family became increasingly dispersed. Alice suffered a nervous breakdown and was institutionalised in Switzerland. Their daughters married and settled in Germany, separated from Andrew, and Philip was sent to school in Britain, where he was brought up by his mother's British relatives. Andrew went to live in the South of France.

On the French Riviera, Andrew lived in a small apartment, or hotel rooms, or on board a yacht with Countess Andrée de La Bigne. His marriage to Alice was effectively over, and after her recovery and release she returned to Greece. In 1936, his sentence of exile was quashed by emergency laws, which also restored land and annuities to the King. Andrew returned to Greece for a brief visit that May. The following year, his pregnant daughter Cecilie, his son-in-law, and two of his grandchildren were killed in an air accident at Ostend; he travelled to London to meet his sixteen-year-old son Philip and they went together to Darmstadt where he met Alice for the first time in six years at the funeral.

During World War II, he found himself essentially trapped in Vichy France, while his son, Philip, fought on the side of the British. They were unable to see or correspond with one another. Andrew's three surviving sons-in-law fought on the German side: Prince Christoph of Hesse was a member of the Nazi Party and the Waffen-SS; Berthold, Margrave of Baden, was invalided out of the Wehrmacht in 1940 after an injury in France; Prince Gottfried of Hohenlohe-Langenburg served on the Eastern Front and was dismissed after the 20 July plot. From 1939 until his death, Andrew saw neither his wife nor his son.

== Death and burial ==
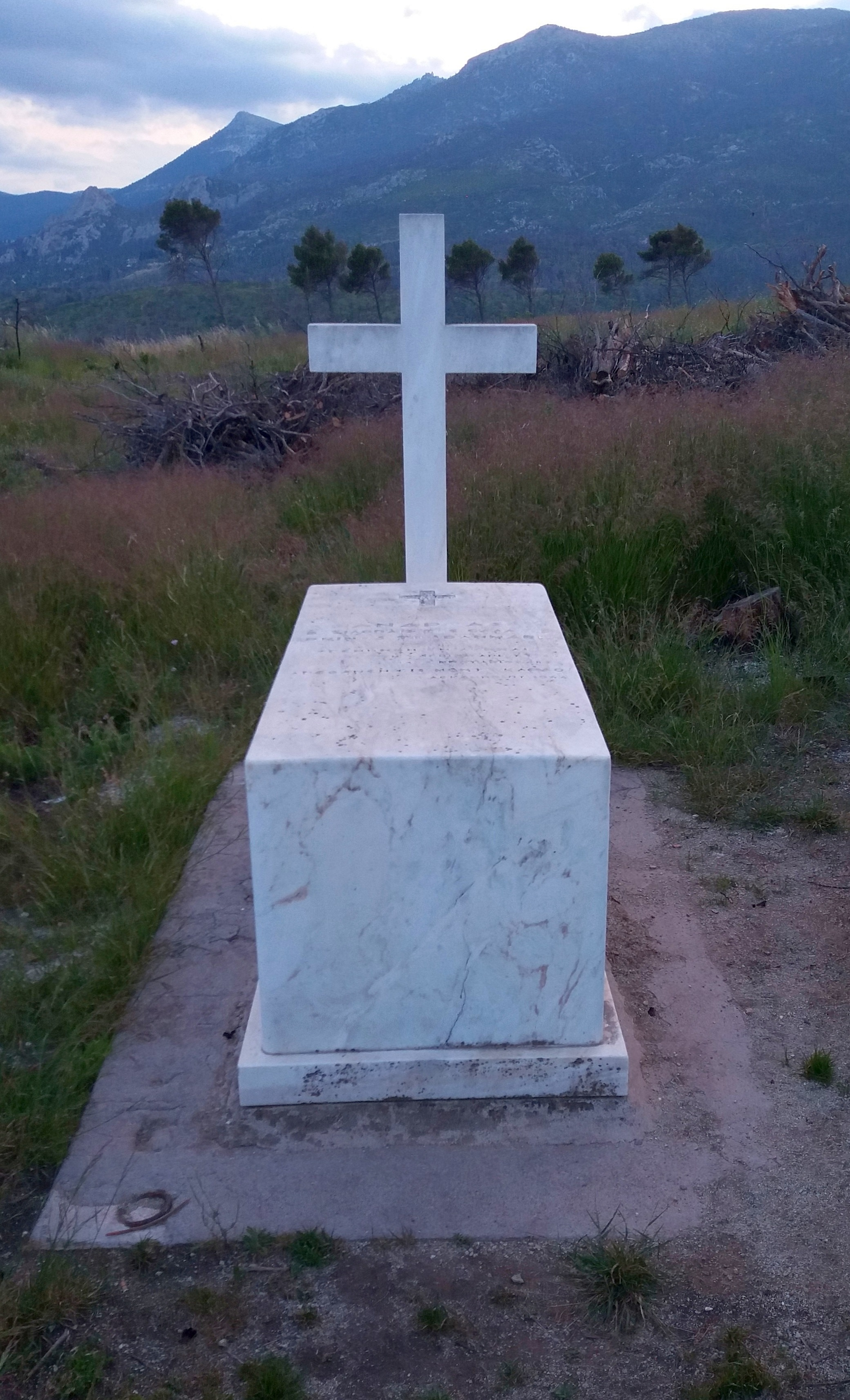
Tomb of Andrew (1882–1944) in Tatoi Royal Cemetery

Andrew died of heart failure and arteriosclerosis at the Hotel Metropole, Monte Carlo, on 3 December 1944, aged 62, in the closing months of the war in Europe. He was at first buried in the Russian Orthodox church in Nice, but in 1946 his remains were transferred, by the Greek cruiser Averof, to the royal cemetery at Tatoi Palace, near Athens. Philip and his then-private secretary, Mike Parker, travelled to Monte Carlo to collect items belonging to Andrew from Andrée de La Bigne; among these were a signet ring which Philip wore from then onwards, an ivory shaving brush he took to using, and some clothes that he had altered to fit him. Andrew left to his only son seven-tenths of his estate, but he also left a debt of £17,500, leading Philip's maternal grandmother, Victoria Mountbatten, Marchioness of Milford Haven, to complain bitterly of the extravagance the Greek prince had been led into by his French mistress.

== Honours and awards ==
- Kingdom of Greece: Knight Grand Cross of the Order of the Redeemer
- Denmark:
  - Knight of the Order of the Elephant, 6 August 1902
  - Cross of Honour of the Order of the Dannebrog, 9 November 1902
  - Commemorative Medal for the Golden Wedding of King Christian IX and Queen Louise
  - King Christian IX Centenary Medal
- German Empire: Knight of the Order of the Black Eagle
  - Hesse and by Rhine: Knight of the Grand Ducal Hessian Order of the Golden Lion, 7 October 1903
- Kingdom of Italy: Knight of the Supreme Order of the Most Holy Annunciation, 8 April 1907
- Monaco: Knight Grand Cross of the Order of Saint-Charles, 14 March 1940
- Norway: Grand Cross of the Royal Norwegian Order of Saint Olav, with Collar, 3 July 1908
- Russian Empire: Knight of the Order of Saint Andrew the Apostle the First-called, 1903
- Kingdom of Spain: Knight Grand Cross of the Royal and Distinguished Order of Charles III, with Collar, 30 May 1906
- United Kingdom of Great Britain and Ireland: Honorary Knight Grand Cross of the Royal Victorian Order, 22 August 1902 – on the occasion of King Edward VII's coronation

== Issue ==
| Name | Birth | Death | Marriage | | Their children |
| Name | Birth | Death | Date | Spouse | Their children |
|---|---|---|---|---|---|
| Princess Margarita | 18 April 1905 | 24 April 1981 (aged 76) | 20 April 1931; Widowed 11 May 1960 | Gottfried, Prince of Hohenlohe-Langenburg | Kraft, Prince of Hohenlohe-Langenburg; Princess Beatrix of Hohenlohe-Langenburg; Prince Georg of Hohenlohe-Langenburg; Prince Rupprecht of Hohenlohe-Langenburg; Prince Albrecht of Hohenlohe-Langenburg |
| Princess Theodora | 30 May 1906 | 16 October 1969 (aged 63) | 17 August 1931; Widowed 27 October 1963 | Berthold, Margrave of Baden | Princess Margarita of Baden; Maximilian, Margrave of Baden; Prince Ludwig of Baden |
| Princess Cecilie | 22 June 1911 | 16 November 1937 (aged 26) | 2 February 1931 | Georg Donatus, Hereditary Grand Duke of Hesse | Prince Ludwig of Hesse and by Rhine; Prince Alexander of Hesse and by Rhine; Princess Johanna of Hesse and by Rhine |
| Princess Sophie | 26 June 1914 | 24 November 2001 (aged 87) | 15 December 1930; Widowed 7 October 1943 | Prince Christoph of Hesse | Princess Christina Margarethe of Hesse; Princess Dorothea of Hesse; Prince Karl of Hesse; Prince Rainer of Hesse; Princess Clarissa Alice of Hesse |
| Princess Sophie | 26 June 1914 | 24 November 2001 (aged 87) | 23 April 1946 | Prince George William of Hanover | Prince Welf Ernst of Hanover; Prince Georg of Hanover; Princess Friederike of Hanover |
| Prince Philip | 10 June 1921 | 9 April 2021 (aged 99) | 20 November 1947 | Elizabeth II, Queen of the United Kingdom | Charles III, King of the United Kingdom; Anne, Princess Royal; Andrew Mountbatten-Windsor; Prince Edward, Duke of Edinburgh |

== Ancestry ==
Ancestors of Prince Andrew of Greece and Denmark

8. Friedrich Wilhelm, Duke of Schleswig-Holstein-Sonderburg-Glücksburg
4. Christian IX of Denmark
9. Princess Louise Caroline of Hesse-Kassel
2. George I of Greece
10. Prince William of Hesse-Kassel
5. Princess Louise of Hesse-Kassel
11. Princess Charlotte of Denmark
1. Prince Andrew of Greece and Denmark
12. Nicholas I of Russia
6. Grand Duke Konstantin Nikolayevich of Russia
13. Princess Charlotte of Prussia
3. Grand Duchess Olga Constantinovna of Russia
14. Joseph, Duke of Saxe-Altenburg
7. Princess Alexandra of Saxe-Altenburg
15. Duchess Amelia of Württemberg
