= Princess Beatrix of Hohenlohe-Langenburg =

German princess (1936–1997)

Princess Beatrix
- Born: 10 July 1936; Schwäbisch Hall, Württemberg, Nazi Germany
- Died: 15 November 1997 (aged 61); Schwäbisch Hall, Baden-Württemberg, Germany
Names
- German: Beatrix Alice Marie Melita Margarete
- House: Hohenlohe-Langenburg
- Father: Gottfried, 8th Prince of Hohenlohe-Langenburg
- Mother: Princess Margarita of Greece and Denmark

Princess Beatrix of Hohenlohe-Langenburg (German: Beatrix Alice Marie Melita Margarete Prinzessin zu Hohenlohe-Langenburg; 10 July 1936 – 15 November 1997) was a German princess from the House of Hohenlohe-Langenburg. She was a niece of Prince Philip, Duke of Edinburgh, and thus a first cousin of King Charles III.

== Biography ==
Beatrix was born on 10 July 1936 in Schwäbisch Hall to Gottfried, Hereditary Prince of Hohenlohe-Langenburg, and Princess Margarita of Greece and Denmark, the eldest sister of Prince Philip, Duke of Edinburgh. The family was not invited to Philip's wedding to Princess Elizabeth of the United Kingdom in 1947, due to her parents' membership in the Nazi Party. Six years later, however, Beatrix and her family were seated in the royal box at her aunt's coronation in Westminster Abbey.

In January 1956, Beatrix and her cousin, Princess Christina of Hesse, moved to London into a flat arranged by their uncle, Prince Philip, in Dolphin Square. The two princesses attracted the attention of the British press as they went about the London season. Beatrix took dressmaking classes at the Royal College of Art. While Princess Christina eventually settled in the United Kingdom, marrying Prince Andrew of Yugoslavia whom the princesses were close friends with during their stay, Beatrix returned to Germany that same year.

In 1961, Beatrix became engaged to her first cousin, Maximilian, Hereditary Prince of Baden. The couple broke off their engagement in September of that year. Maximilian later married Archduchess Valerie of Austria (b. 1941) in 1966 and Beatrix never married.

In her later years, she served as secretary to Margaret, Princess of Hesse and by Rhine, the sister-in-law of her aunt, Princess Cecilie. She lived in Langenburg, Germany, for most of her life. She continued to attend family events in Britain, such as the weddings of her cousins Prince Charles (later King Charles III) and Prince Andrew in 1981 and 1986, respectively.

Beatrix died on 15 November 1997, aged 61, in the town where she was born.

== Ancestry ==
Ancestors of Princess Beatrix of Hohenlohe-Langenburg

8. Hermann, 6th Prince of Hohenlohe-Langenburg
4. Ernst, 7th Prince of Hohenlohe-Langenburg
9. Princess Leopoldine of Baden
2. Gottfried, 8th Prince of Hohenlohe-Langenburg
10. Alfred, Duke of Saxe-Coburg and Gotha
5. Princess Alexandra of Saxe-Coburg and Gotha
11. Grand Duchess Maria Alexandrovna of Russia
1. Princess Beatrix of Hohenlohe-Langenburg
12. George I of Greece
6. Prince Andrew of Greece and Denmark
13. Grand Duchess Olga Constantinovna of Russia
3. Princess Margarita of Greece and Denmark
14. Prince Louis of Battenberg
7. Princess Alice of Battenberg
15. Princess Victoria of Hesse and by Rhine
