= Gottfried, Prince of Hohenlohe-Langenburg =

German noble (1897–1960)

Gottfried
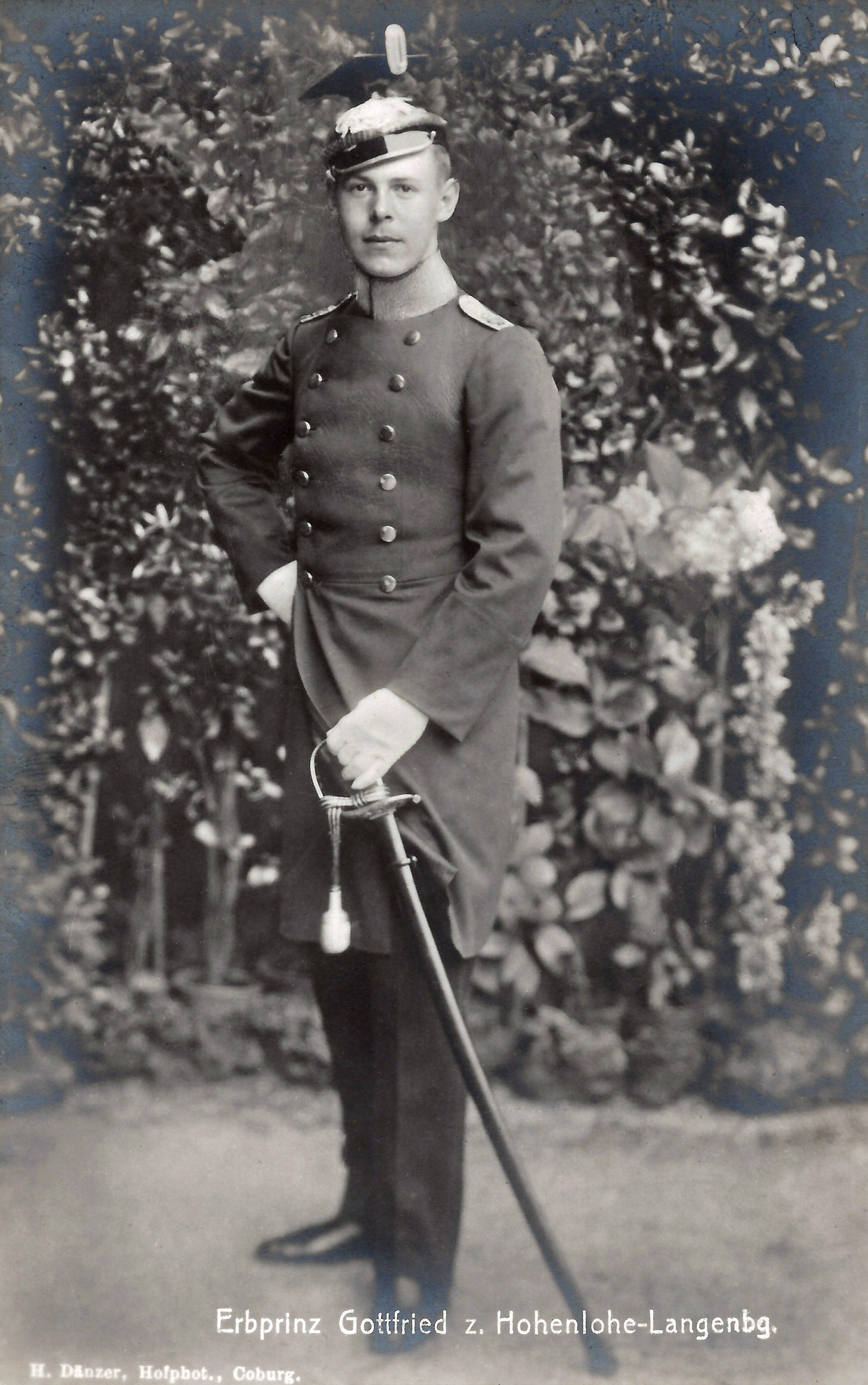
- The prince in uniform, c. 1916

Prince of Hohenlohe-Langenburg
- Tenure: 11 December 1950 – 11 May 1960
- Predecessor: Ernst II
- Successor: Kraft
- Born: 24 March 1897; Langenburg, German Empire
- Died: 11 May 1960 (aged 63); Langenburg, West Germany
- Burial: Langenburg Castle
- Spouse: Princess Margarita of Greece and Denmark (m. 1931)
- Issue: Kraft, Prince of Hohenlohe-Langenburg; Princess Beatrix; Prince Georg Andreas; Prince Rupprecht; Prince Albrecht
Names
- German: Gottfried Hermann Alfred Paul Maximilian Viktor
- House: Hohenlohe-Langenburg
- Father: Ernst II, Prince of Hohenlohe-Langenburg
- Mother: Alexandra of Edinburgh

Gottfried, 8th Prince of Hohenlohe-Langenburg (German: Gottfried Hermann Alfred Paul Maximilian Viktor Fürst zu Hohenlohe-Langenburg; 24 March 1897 – 11 May 1960) was the only surviving son of Ernst II, Prince of Hohenlohe-Langenburg.

At the death of his father in 1950, Gottfried inherited the title of Prince of Hohenlohe-Langenburg.

== Early life ==
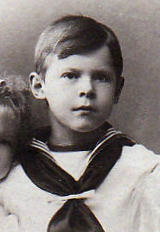
Prince Gottfried at the age of nine

Gottfried was born at Langenburg, Kingdom of Württemberg, the first child of Ernst II, Prince of Hohenlohe-Langenburg (son of Hermann, Prince of Hohenlohe-Langenburg and Princess Leopoldine of Baden) and his wife, Princess Alexandra of Edinburgh (daughter of Alfred, Duke of Saxe-Coburg and Gotha and Grand Duchess Maria Alexandrovna of Russia). Through his maternal grandparents, he was a great-grandson of Queen Victoria and of Tsar Alexander II.

On 1 May 1937, he joined the Nazi Party the same day as his mother, with the membership number of 4023070. He served as an army officer in World War II, becoming severely injured at the Russian front. He was dismissed from the army after the abortive attempt on Adolf Hitler's life on 20 July 1944.

== Marriage and issue ==
Gottfried was briefly engaged during 1927–28 to Gloria Morgan Vanderbilt, the widow of Reginald Claypoole Vanderbilt. That engagement was however repudiated. On 3 December 1930, Gottfried became engaged to Princess Margarita of Greece and Denmark. Margarita was the daughter of Prince Andrew of Greece and Denmark and his wife, Princess Alice of Battenberg. Gottfried and Margarita were second cousins once removed through Queen Victoria and third cousins through Nicholas I of Russia. Margarita's younger brother Prince Philip in 1947 married Princess Elizabeth, daughter of Gottfried's second cousin, King George VI. Elizabeth succeeded her father to the throne of the United Kingdom as Queen Elizabeth II.

Gottfried and Margarita had a generally harmonious marriage. They had six children, six grandchildren and nine great-grandchildren:

- A stillborn daughter (born and died 3 December 1933)
- Prince Kraft Alexander Ernst Ludwig Georg Emich (25 June 1935 – 16 March 2004); succeeded his father as Prince of Hohenlohe-Langenburg. He married Princess Charlotte Alexandra Marie Clotilde of Croÿ (31 December 1938) on 5 June 1965 at Langenburg, Baden-Württemburg, Germany. They had three children:
  - Princess Cécile Marita Dorothea of Hohenlohe-Langenburg (16 December 1967); married Count Cyril of Commarque on 6 June 1998 at Cadouin Abbey, Dordogne.
  - Prince Philipp Gottfried Alexander of Hohenlohe-Langenburg (20 January 1970); married Saskia Binder on 13 September 2003. They had three children:
    - Max-Leopold Ernst Kraft Peter, Hereditary Prince of Hohenlohe-Langenburg (22 March 2005)
    - Prince Gustav Philipp Friedrich Alexander (28 January 2007)
    - Princess Marita Saskia Friedelinde Charlotte (23 November 2010)
  - Princess Xenia Margarita Anne of Hohenlohe-Langenburg (8 July 1972); married Max Soltmann on 13 August 2005 at Obertaukirchen, Bayern, Germany. They had two children:
    - Ferdinand Gabriele Kraft Soltmann (5 November 2005)
    - Louisa Marei Charlotte Soltmann (6 April 2008)
- Princess Beatrix Alice Marie Melita Margarete of Hohenlohe-Langenburg (10 June 1936 – 15 November 1997), once engaged to her first cousin Maximilian, Margrave of Baden
- Prince Georg Andreas Heinrich of Hohenlohe-Langenburg (24 November 1938 – 28 October 2021); married Princess Luise Pauline Amelie Vibeke Beatrix of Schönburg-Waldenburg (12 October 1943) on 9 September 1968. They had two daughters:
  - Princess Katharina Clementine Beatrix of Hohenlohe-Langenburg (21 November 1972); married Prince Nikolaus of Waldeck and Pyrmont (2 November 1970) on 29 September 2002. They have two daughters:
    - Princess Laetitia Antoinette Julia Tatjana Felicitas of Waldeck and Pyrmont (2 December 2003).
    - Princess Alexia Natalie Luise Tatjana Maresa of Waldeck and Pyrmont (20 June 2006).
  - Princess Tatjana Luise of Hohenlohe-Langenburg (10 February 1975); married Hubertus Stephan (d. 10 May 2018 in a traffic collision). They had two sons:
    - Carl Stephan (b. 2012).
    - Wolf Thomas Dres Stephan (b. 2013).
- Prince Rupprecht Sigismund Philipp Ernst of Hohenlohe-Langenburg (7 April 1944 – 8 April 1978)
- Prince Albrecht Wolfgang Christoph of Hohenlohe-Langenburg (7 April 1944 – 23 April 1992); married Maria-Hildegard Fischer (b. 1933) on 23 January 1976. They had one son:
  - Prince Ludwig Ferdinand of Hohenlohe-Langenburg (b. 1976); married Deborah Katharina Zilian (b. 1988) in 2022.

Their four elder children were all born at Schwäbisch Hall, while the two youngest boys, twins, were born in Langenburg.

== Later years and death ==
After World War II, he was appointed as district administrator (Landrat) of Crailsheim. Gottfried became an advocate for West German business interests, which included securing land leases in Liberia. Together with his wife and their three elder children, he took part in the ship tour organized by Queen Frederica and her husband King Paul of Greece in 1954, which became known as the “Cruise of the Kings” and was attended by over 100 royals from all over Europe.

On 11 May 1960, Gottfried died at Langenburg Castle after a long illness. He is buried on the castle grounds.

== Archives ==
Prince Gottfried's personal papers (including family correspondence and photographs) are preserved in the Hohenlohe-Langenburg family archive (Nachlass Fürst Gottfried, HZAN La 145), which is in the Hohenlohe Central Archive (Hohenlohe-Zentralarchiv Neuenstein) in Neuenstein Castle in the town of Neuenstein, Baden-Württemberg, Germany.

== Ancestry ==
Ancestors of Gottfried, Prince of Hohenlohe-Langenburg

8. Ernst I, 4th Prince of Hohenlohe-Langenburg
4. Hermann, 6th Prince of Hohenlohe-Langenburg
9. Princess Feodora of Leiningen
2. Ernst II, 7th Prince of Hohenlohe-Langenburg
10. Prince William of Baden
5. Princess Leopoldine of Baden
11. Duchess Elisabeth of Württemberg
1. Gottfried, 8th Prince of Hohenlohe-Langenburg
12. Prince Albert of Saxe-Coburg and Gotha
6. Alfred, Duke of Saxe-Coburg and Gotha
13. Victoria of the United Kingdom
3. Princess Alexandra of Edinburgh
14. Alexander II of Russia
7. Grand Duchess Maria Alexandrovna of Russia
15. Princess Marie of Hesse and by Rhine

== Sources ==
- Queen Victoria's Descendants, New York, 1987, Eilers, Marlene A., Reference: 197

Gottfried, 8th Prince of Hohenlohe-Langenburg House of Hohenlohe-Langenburg Cadet branch of the House of Hohenlohe Born: 24 March 1897 Died: 11 May 1960
Titles in pretence
Preceded by Ernst II	— TITULAR — Prince of Hohenlohe-Langenburg; 11 December 1950 – 11 May 1960; Reason for succession failure: German nobility titles abolished	Succeeded by Kraft
