= Princess Alice of Battenberg =

Princess Andrew of Greece and Denmark (1885–1969)

Alice of Battenberg
- Princess Andrew of Greece and Denmark
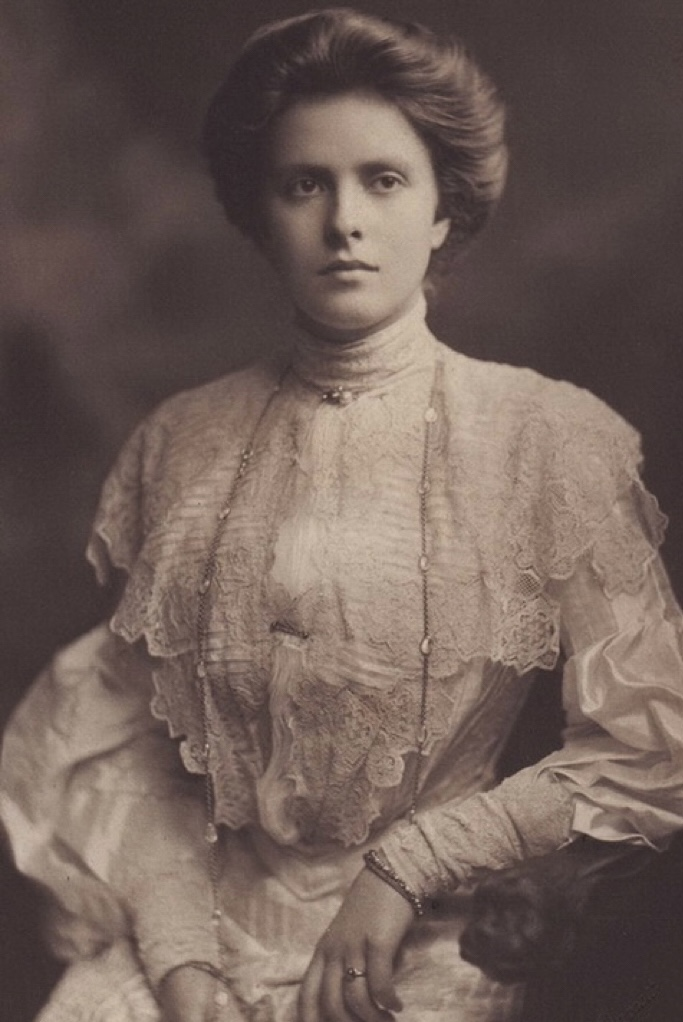
- Alice in 1903
- Born: 25 February 1885; Windsor Castle, Berkshire, England
- Died: 5 December 1969 (aged 84); Buckingham Palace, London, England
- Burial: 10 December 1969; St George's Chapel, Windsor Castle; 3 August 1988; Church of Mary Magdalene, Gethsemane, Jerusalem
- Spouse: Prince Andrew of Greece and Denmark (m. 1903; died 1944)
- Issue: Margarita, Princess of Hohenlohe-Langenburg; Theodora, Margravine of Baden; Cecilie, Hereditary Grand Duchess of Hesse; Sophie, Princess George of Hanover; Prince Philip, Duke of Edinburgh
Names
- Victoria Alice Elizabeth Julia Marie
- House: Battenberg
- Father: Prince Louis of Battenberg
- Mother: Princess Victoria of Hesse and by Rhine

Princess Alice of Battenberg (Victoria Alice Elizabeth Julia Marie; 25 February 1885 – 5 December 1969) was the mother of Prince Philip, Duke of Edinburgh, mother-in-law of Queen Elizabeth II, and paternal grandmother of King Charles III. After marrying Prince Andrew of Greece and Denmark in 1903, she adopted the style of her husband, becoming Princess Andrew of Greece and Denmark.

A great-granddaughter of Queen Victoria, Alice was born at Windsor Castle and grew up in the United Kingdom, Germany and Malta. A Hessian princess by birth, she was a member of the Battenberg family, a morganatic branch of the House of Hesse-Darmstadt. She was congenitally deaf. She lived in Greece until the exile of most of the Greek royal family in 1917. On returning to Greece a few years later, her husband was blamed in part for the country's defeat in the Greco-Turkish War (1919–1922), and the family was once again forced into exile until the restoration of the Greek monarchy in 1935.

In 1930, Alice was diagnosed with schizophrenia and committed to a sanatorium in Switzerland; thereafter, she lived separately from her husband. After her recovery, she devoted most of her remaining years to charity work in Greece. She stayed in Athens during the Second World War, sheltering Jewish refugees, for which she is recognised as "Righteous Among the Nations" by Israel's Holocaust memorial institution, Yad Vashem. After the war, she stayed in Greece and founded a Greek Orthodox nursing order of nuns known as the Christian Sisterhood of Martha and Mary.

After the fall of King Constantine II of Greece and the imposition of military rule in Greece in 1967, Alice was invited by her son and daughter-in-law to live at Buckingham Palace in London, where she died two years later. In 1988, her remains were transferred from a vault in her birthplace, Windsor Castle, to the Church of Mary Magdalene at the Russian Orthodox convent of the same name on the Mount of Olives in Jerusalem.

== Early life ==
Alice was born at 4:40 pm on 25 February 1885 in the Tapestry Room at Windsor Castle, Berkshire, in the presence of her great-grandmother Queen Victoria. She was the eldest child of Prince Louis of Battenberg and his wife, Princess Victoria of Hesse and by Rhine. Her mother was the eldest daughter of Louis IV, Grand Duke of Hesse, and Princess Alice of the United Kingdom, the Queen's second daughter. Her father was the eldest son of Prince Alexander of Hesse and by Rhine through his morganatic marriage to Countess Julia Hauke, who was created Princess of Battenberg in 1858 by Louis III, Grand Duke of Hesse. Her three younger siblings, Louise, George, and Louis, later became Queen of Sweden, Marquess of Milford Haven, and Earl Mountbatten of Burma, respectively.

She was christened Victoria Alice Elizabeth Julia Marie in Darmstadt on 25 April. Alice had six godparents: her three surviving grandparents, Grand Duke Louis IV of Hesse, Prince Alexander of Hesse and by Rhine, and Julia, Princess of Battenberg; her maternal aunt Grand Duchess Elizabeth Feodorovna of Russia; her paternal aunt Princess Marie of Erbach-Schönberg; and her maternal great-grandmother Queen Victoria.

Alice spent her childhood between Darmstadt, London, Jugenheim, and Malta (where her naval officer father was occasionally stationed). Her mother noticed that she was slow in learning to talk, and became concerned by her indistinct pronunciation. Eventually, she was diagnosed with congenital deafness after her grandmother, the Princess of Battenberg, identified the problem and took her to see an ear specialist. With encouragement from her mother, Alice learned to both lip-read and speak in English and German. Educated privately, she studied French, and after her engagement she learned Greek. Her early years were spent in the company of her royal relatives, and she was a bridesmaid at the wedding of Prince George, Duke of York, and Princess Mary of Teck (later King George V and Queen Mary) in 1893. A few weeks before her 16th birthday, she attended Queen Victoria's funeral in St George's Chapel, Windsor Castle, and shortly afterward she was confirmed in the Anglican faith.

== Marriage ==
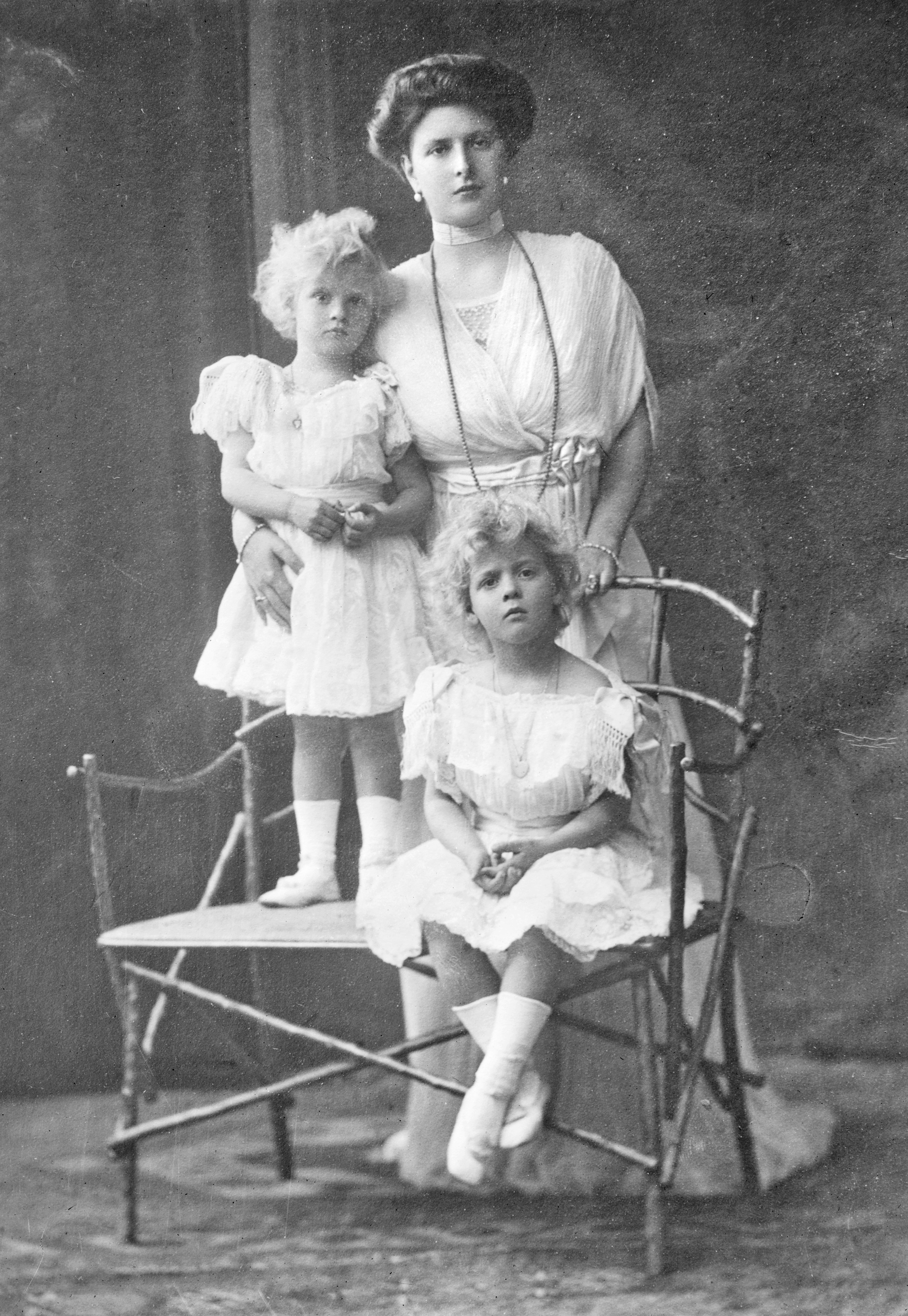
Alice with her first two children, Margarita and Theodora, c. 1910

Alice met Prince Andrew of Greece and Denmark (known as Andrea within the family), the fourth son of King George I of Greece and Olga Constantinovna of Russia, while in London for King Edward VII's coronation in 1902. They married in a civil ceremony on 6 October 1903 in Darmstadt. The following day, there were two religious marriage ceremonies; one Lutheran at the Evangelical Castle Church, and one Greek Orthodox at the Russian Chapel on the Mathildenhöhe. She adopted the style of her husband, becoming "Princess Andrew". The bride and groom were closely related to the ruling houses of the United Kingdom, Germany, Russia, Denmark, and Greece, and their wedding was one of the great gatherings of the descendants of Queen Victoria and King Christian IX held before World War I. Alice and Andrew had five children: Margarita, Theodora, Cecilie, Sophie, and Philip.

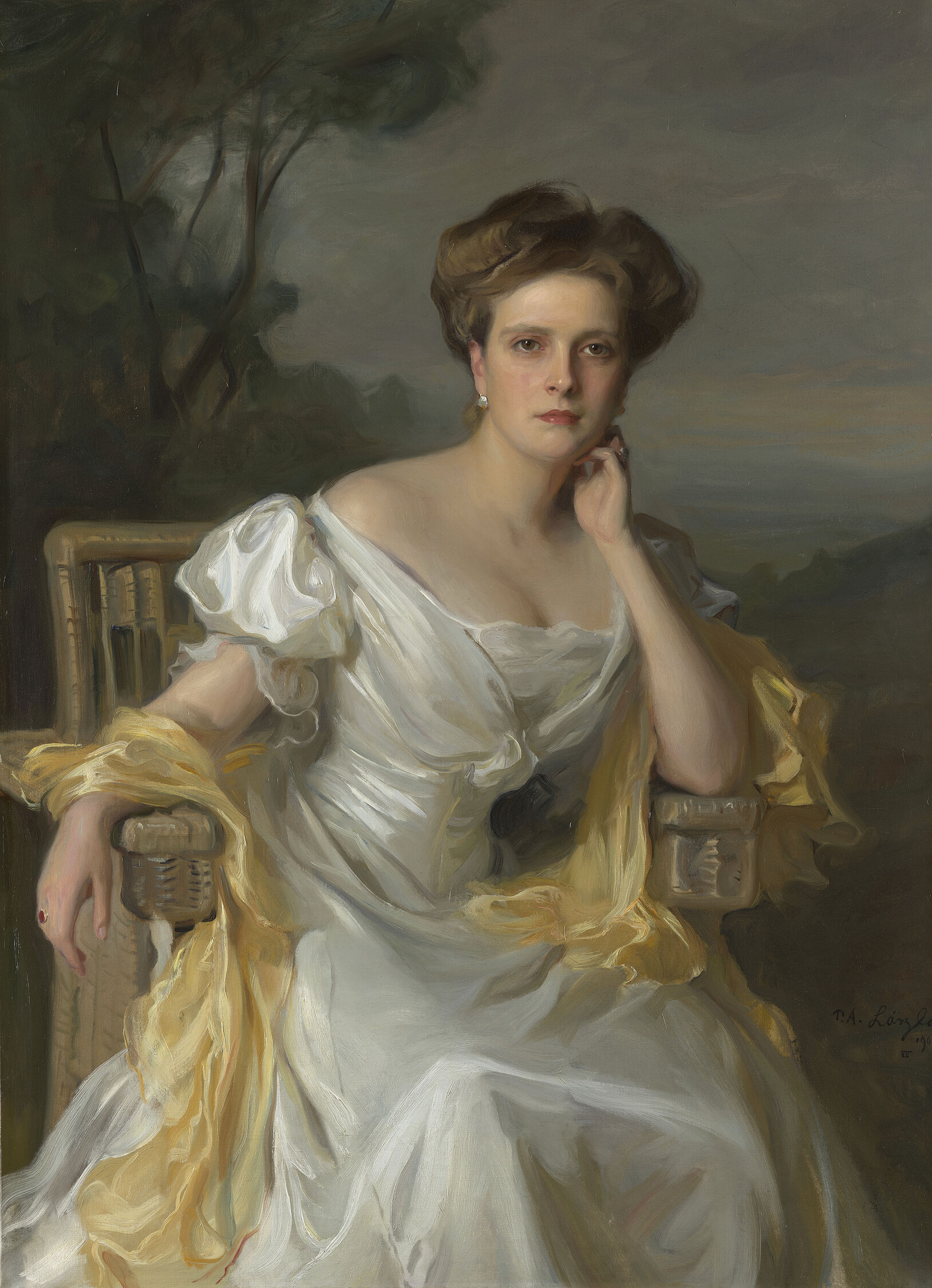
Princess Andrew of Greece and Denmark by Philip de László, 1907. Private collection of Prince Philip, Duke of Edinburgh.

After their wedding, Andrew continued his career in the military and Alice became involved in charity work. In 1908, she visited Russia for the wedding of Grand Duchess Marie of Russia and Prince William of Sweden. While there, she talked with her aunt Grand Duchess Elizabeth Feodorovna, who was formulating plans for the foundation of a religious order of nurses. Alice attended the laying of the foundation stone for her aunt's new church. Later in the year, Elizabeth began giving away all her possessions in preparation for a more spiritual life. On their return to Greece, Alice and Andrew found the political situation worsening, as the Athens government had refused to support the Cretan parliament, which had called for the union of Crete (still nominally part of the Ottoman Empire) with the Greek mainland. A group of dissatisfied officers formed a Greek nationalist Military League that eventually led to Andrew's resignation from the army and the rise to power of Eleftherios Venizelos.

== Successive life crises ==
With the advent of the Balkan Wars, Andrew was reinstated in the army, and Alice acted as a nurse, assisting at operations and setting up field hospitals, work for which King George V awarded her the Royal Red Cross in 1913. During World War I, her brother-in-law King Constantine I of Greece followed a neutrality policy despite the democratically elected government of Venizelos supporting the Allies. She and her children were forced to shelter in the palace cellars during the French bombardment of Athens on 1 December 1916. By June 1917, the King's neutrality policy had become so untenable that she and other members of the Greek royal family were forced into exile when King Constantine abdicated. For the next few years, most of the Greek royal family lived in Switzerland.

The global war effectively ended much of the political power of Europe's dynasties. The naval career of Alice's father, Prince Louis of Battenberg, had collapsed at the beginning of the war in the face of anti-German sentiment in Britain. At the request of King George V, he relinquished the Hessian title Prince of Battenberg and the style of Serene Highness on 14 July 1917, and anglicised the family name to Mountbatten. The following day, the King created him Marquess of Milford Haven in the peerage of the United Kingdom. The following year, two of Alice's aunts, Empress Alexandra Feodorovna of Russia and Grand Duchess Elizabeth Feodorovna, were murdered by Bolsheviks after the Russian Revolution. At the end of the war the Russian, German and Austro-Hungarian empires had fallen, and her uncle Ernest Louis, Grand Duke of Hesse, was deposed.

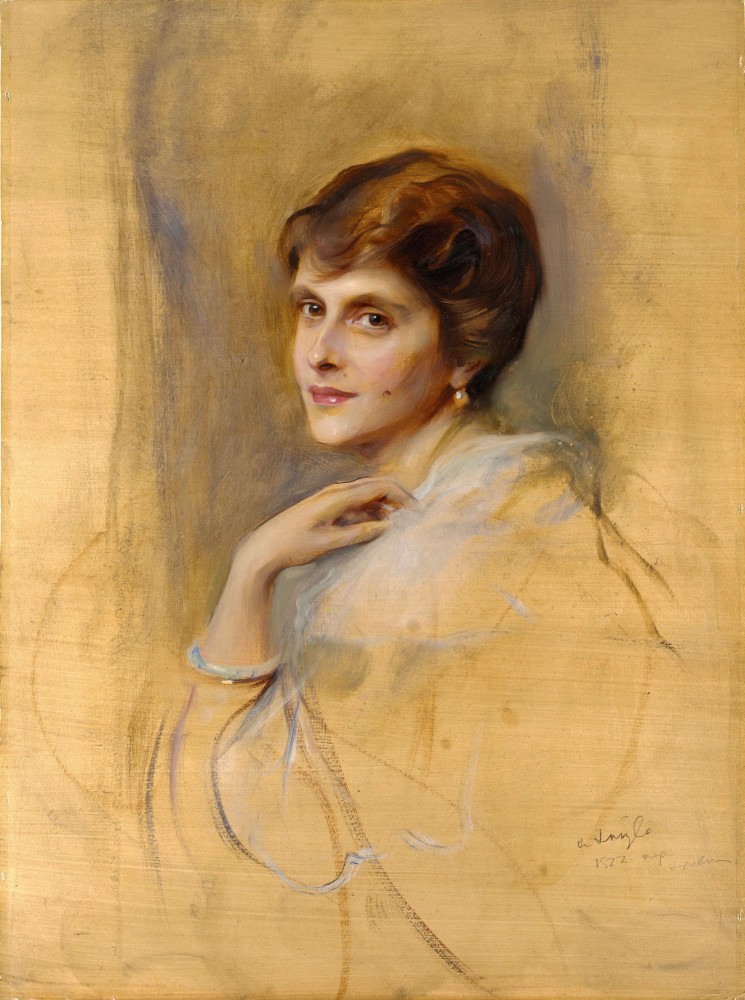
Princess Andrew of Greece and Denmark by Philip de László, 1922. Private collection of Prince Philip, Duke of Edinburgh.

On Constantine's restoration in 1920, Alice and Andrew briefly returned to Greece, taking up residence on Corfu at Mon Repos (inherited by Andrew on his father's assassination in 1913). But after the defeat of the Hellenic Army in the Greco-Turkish War, a Revolutionary Committee under the leadership of Colonels Nikolaos Plastiras and Stylianos Gonatas seized power and forced King Constantine into exile once again. Andrew, who had served as commander of the Second Army Corps during the war, was arrested. Several former ministers and generals arrested at the same time were shot following a brief trial, and British diplomats assumed that he was also in mortal danger. After a show trial, he was sentenced to banishment, and Andrew, Alice, and their children fled Greece aboard a British cruiser, HMS Calypso, under the protection of the British naval attaché, Commander Gerald Talbot.

== Illness ==
The family settled in a small house loaned to them by Princess George of Greece and Denmark at Saint-Cloud, on the outskirts of Paris, where Alice helped in a charity shop for Greek refugees. She became deeply religious and, in October 1928, converted to the Greek Orthodox Church. That winter, she translated into English her husband's defence of his actions during the Greco-Turkish War. Soon afterward, she began claiming that she was receiving divine messages and that she had healing powers.

In 1930, her behaviour became increasingly erratic, and she asserted that she was in communication with the Buddha and Christ. She was diagnosed with paranoid schizophrenia, first by Thomas Ross, a psychiatrist specialising in the treatment of shell shock, and subsequently by Sir Maurice Craig, who had treated the future King George VI before he had speech therapy. The diagnosis was confirmed at Ernst Simmel's sanatorium at Tegel, Berlin. She was forcibly removed from her family and placed in Ludwig Binswanger's sanatorium in Kreuzlingen, Switzerland. It was a famous and well-respected institution with several celebrity patients, including Vaslav Nijinsky, the ballet dancer and choreographer, who was there at the same time as Alice. Binswanger also diagnosed her with schizophrenia. Both he and Simmel sought advice from Sigmund Freud, who concluded that the delusions derived from sexual frustration and suggested "X-raying her ovaries in order to kill off her libido." She continued to assert her sanity and made repeated efforts to leave the sanatorium.

During Alice's long convalescence, she and Andrew drifted apart, her daughters all married German princes in 1930 and 1931 (she did not attend any of the weddings), and Philip went to the United Kingdom to stay with his maternal uncles, Lord Louis Mountbatten and George Mountbatten, 2nd Marquess of Milford Haven, and his maternal grandmother, the Dowager Marchioness of Milford Haven.

Alice remained at Kreuzlingen for two years, but after a brief stay at a clinic in Merano in northern Italy, was released and began an itinerant, incognito existence in Central Europe. She maintained contact with her mother but broke off ties to the rest of her family until the end of 1936. In 1937, her daughter Cecilie, her son-in-law Georg, and two of her grandchildren were killed in an air accident at Ostend; she and Andrew met for the first time in six years at the funeral. (Philip and Lord Louis Mountbatten also attended.) She resumed contact with her family, and in 1938 returned to Athens alone to work with the poor, while living in a two-bedroom flat near the Benaki Museum.

== World War II ==
During World War II, Alice was in the difficult situation of having sons-in-law fighting on the German side and a son in the British Royal Navy. Her cousin, Prince Victor zu Erbach-Schönberg, was the German ambassador in Greece until the occupation of Athens by Axis forces in April 1941. She and her sister-in-law, Princess Nicholas of Greece, lived in Athens for the duration of the war, while most of the Greek royal family remained in exile in South Africa. She moved out of her small flat and into her brother-in-law George's three-storey house in the centre of Athens. She worked for the Red Cross, helped organise soup kitchens for the starving populace and flew to Sweden to bring back medical supplies on the pretext of visiting her sister, Crown Princess Louise. She organised two shelters for orphaned and lost children, and a nursing circuit for poor neighbourhoods.

The occupying forces apparently presumed Alice was pro-German, as one of her sons-in-law, Prince Christoph of Hesse, was a member of the NSDAP and the Waffen-SS, and another, Berthold, Margrave of Baden, had been invalided out of the German army in 1940 after an injury in France. Nonetheless, when visited by a German general who asked her if there was anything he could do for her, she replied, "You can take your troops out of my country".

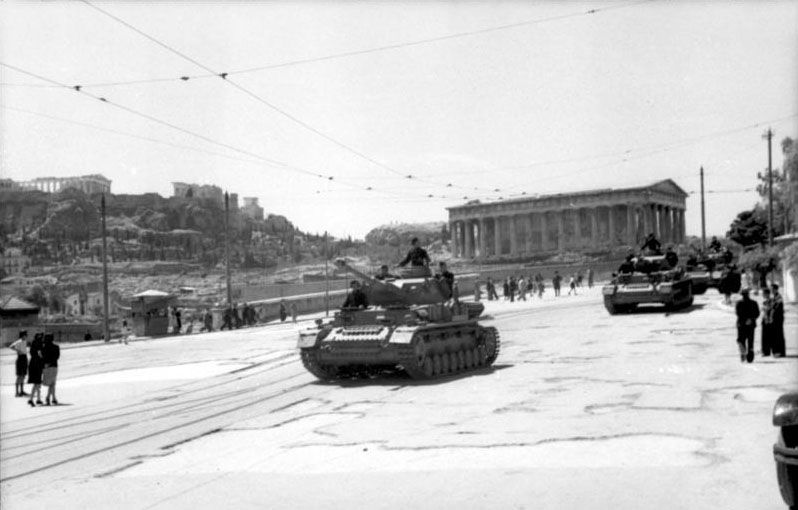
German tanks roll through Athens, 1943

After the fall of Italian dictator Benito Mussolini in September 1943, the German Army occupied Athens, where a minority of Greek Jews had sought refuge. The majority (about 60,000 out of a total population of 75,000) were deported to Nazi concentration camps, where all but 2,000 died. During this period, Alice hid Jewish widow Rachel Cohen and two of her five children, who sought to evade the Gestapo and deportation to the death camps. In 1913, Rachel's husband, Haimaki Cohen, had aided King George I of Greece. In return, King George had offered him any service that he could perform should Cohen ever need it. Years later, during the Nazi threat, Cohen's son remembered this and appealed to Alice, who, with Princess Nicholas, was one of only two remaining members of the royal family left in Greece. Alice honoured the promise and saved the Cohen family.

When Athens was liberated in October 1944, Harold Macmillan visited Alice and described her as "living in humble, not to say somewhat squalid conditions". In a letter to her son, she admitted that in the last week before liberation she had had no food except bread and butter, and no meat for several months. By early December, the situation in Athens was far from improved; Communist guerrillas (ELAS) were fighting the British for control of the capital. As the fighting continued, Alice was informed that her husband had died, just as hopes of a post-war reunion of the couple were rising. They had not seen each other since 1939. During the fighting, to the dismay of the British, she insisted on walking the streets distributing rations to policemen and children in contravention of the curfew order. When warned that she was in danger of being struck by a stray bullet, she replied, "They tell me that you don't hear the shot that kills you and in any case I am deaf. So, why worry about that?"

== Widowhood ==
Alice returned to the United Kingdom in April 1947 to attend the November wedding of her only son, Philip, to Princess Elizabeth, the elder daughter and heir presumptive of King George VI. She had some of her remaining jewels used in Elizabeth's engagement ring. On the day of the wedding, her son was created Duke of Edinburgh by George VI. For the wedding ceremony, Alice sat at the head of her family on the north side of Westminster Abbey, opposite the King, Queen Elizabeth, and Queen Mary. Her daughters were not invited to the wedding because of anti-German sentiment in Britain following World War II.

In January 1949, Alice founded a nursing order of Greek Orthodox nuns, the Christian Sisterhood of Martha and Mary, modelled after the convent that her aunt, the martyr Grand Duchess Elizabeth Feodorovna, had founded in Russia in 1909. She trained on the Greek island of Tinos, established a home for the order in a hamlet north of Athens, and undertook two tours of the United States in 1950 and 1952 in an effort to raise funds. Her mother was baffled by her actions, "What can you say of a nun who smokes and plays canasta?", she said. Alice's daughter-in-law became queen of the Commonwealth realms in 1952, and she attended the new queen's coronation in June 1953 wearing a two-tone grey dress and wimple in the style of a nun's habit. The order eventually failed due to a lack of suitable applicants.

In 1960, she visited India at the invitation of Rajkumari Amrit Kaur, who had been impressed by Alice's interest in Indian religious thought, and for her own spiritual quest. The trip was cut short when she unexpectedly took ill, and her sister-in-law, Edwina Mountbatten, Countess Mountbatten of Burma, who happened to be passing through Delhi on her own tour, had to smooth things with the Indian hosts who were taken aback at Alice's sudden change of plans. She later claimed she had had an out-of-body experience. Edwina continued her own tour, and died the following month.

Increasingly deaf and in failing health, Alice left Greece for the last time following the 21 April 1967 Colonels' Coup. Queen Elizabeth II and Philip invited her to reside permanently at Buckingham Palace in London. King Constantine II and Queen Anne-Marie of Greece went into exile that December after a failed royalist counter-coup.

== Death and burial ==
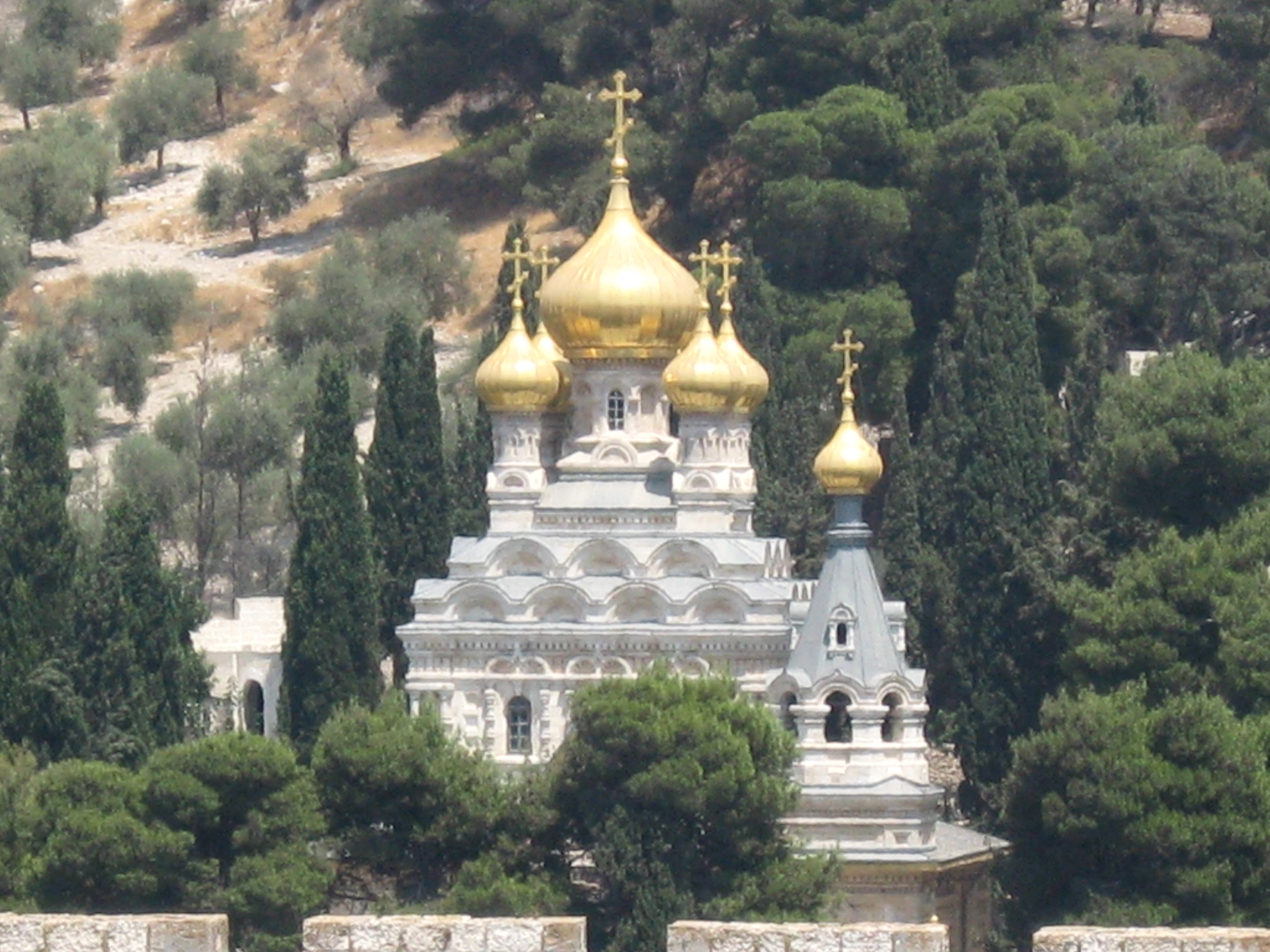
Church of Mary Magdalene, Alice's burial place in Jerusalem

Despite suggestions of senility in later life, Alice remained lucid but physically frail. She died at Buckingham Palace on 5 December 1969, aged 84. She left no possessions, having given everything away. Initially her remains were placed in the Royal Crypt in St George's Chapel at Windsor Castle on 10 December, but before she died she had expressed her wish to be buried at the Convent of Saint Mary Magdalene in Gethsemane on the Mount of Olives in Jerusalem (near her aunt Grand Duchess Elizabeth Feodorovna). When her daughter Sophie complained that it would be too far away for them to visit her grave, she jested, "Nonsense, there's a perfectly good bus service!" Her wish was realised on 3 August 1988 when her remains were transferred to a crypt below the church.

On 31 October 1994, Alice's two surviving children, Philip and Sophie, went to Yad Vashem (the Holocaust Memorial) in Jerusalem to witness a ceremony honouring her as "Righteous Among the Nations" for having hidden the Cohens in her house in Athens during the Second World War. He said of his mother's sheltering of persecuted Jews, "I suspect that it never occurred to her that her action was in any way special. She was a person with a deep religious faith, and she would have considered it to be a perfectly natural human reaction to fellow beings in distress." In 2010, Alice was posthumously named a Hero of the Holocaust by the British Government.

== Titles and styles ==
- 25 February 1885 – 6 October 1903: Her Serene Highness Princess Alice of Battenberg
- 6 October 1903 – 5 December 1969: Her Royal Highness Princess Andrew of Greece and Denmark
- From 1949 until her death, she was sometimes known as Mother Superior Alice-Elizabeth

== Honours ==
- (Grand Duchy of Hesse) Dame of the Order of the Golden Lion, 7 October 1903
- (Kingdom of Greece) Dame Grand Cross of the Order of Saints Olga and Sophia
- (United Kingdom) Royal Red Cross, 1913
- (Restoration (Spain)) Dame of the Order of Queen Maria Luisa, 9 April 1928

Posthumous:

- (Israel) Righteous Among the Nations, 1993
- (United Kingdom) British Hero of the Holocaust, 2010

== Issue ==
| Name | Birth | Death | Marriage | | Their children |
| Name | Birth | Death | Date | Spouse | Their children |
|---|---|---|---|---|---|
| Princess Margarita | 18 April 1905 | 24 April 1981 (aged 76) | 20 April 1931; Widowed 11 May 1960 | Gottfried, Prince of Hohenlohe-Langenburg | Kraft, Prince of Hohenlohe-Langenburg; Princess Beatrix of Hohenlohe-Langenburg; Prince Georg of Hohenlohe-Langenburg; Prince Rupprecht of Hohenlohe-Langenburg; Prince Albrecht of Hohenlohe-Langenburg |
| Princess Theodora | 30 May 1906 | 16 October 1969 (aged 63) | 17 August 1931; Widowed 27 October 1963 | Berthold, Margrave of Baden | Princess Margarita of Baden; Maximilian, Margrave of Baden; Prince Ludwig of Baden |
| Princess Cecilie | 22 June 1911 | 16 November 1937 (aged 26) | 2 February 1931 | Georg Donatus, Hereditary Grand Duke of Hesse | Prince Ludwig of Hesse and by Rhine; Prince Alexander of Hesse and by Rhine; Princess Johanna of Hesse and by Rhine |
| Princess Sophie | 26 June 1914 | 24 November 2001 (aged 87) | 15 December 1930; Widowed 7 October 1943 | Prince Christoph of Hesse | Princess Christina Margarethe of Hesse; Princess Dorothea of Hesse; Prince Karl of Hesse; Prince Rainer of Hesse; Princess Clarissa Alice of Hesse |
| Princess Sophie | 26 June 1914 | 24 November 2001 (aged 87) | 23 April 1946 | Prince George William of Hanover | Prince Welf Ernst of Hanover; Prince Georg of Hanover; Princess Friederike of Hanover |
| Prince Philip, Duke of Edinburgh | 10 June 1921 | 9 April 2021 (aged 99) | 20 November 1947 | Elizabeth II, Queen of the United Kingdom | Charles III, King of the United Kingdom; Anne, Princess Royal; Andrew Mountbatten-Windsor; Prince Edward, Duke of Edinburgh |

== Ancestry ==
Ancestors of Princess Alice of Battenberg

8. Louis II, Grand Duke of Hesse and by Rhine
4. Prince Alexander of Hesse and by Rhine
9. Princess Wilhelmine of Baden
2. Prince Louis of Battenberg
10. Hans Moritz Hauke
5. Julia, Princess of Battenberg
11. Sophie Lafontaine
1. Alice, Princess Andrew of Greece and Denmark
12. Prince Charles of Hesse and by Rhine
6. Louis IV, Grand Duke of Hesse and by Rhine
13. Princess Elisabeth of Prussia
3. Princess Victoria of Hesse and by Rhine
14. Prince Albert of Saxe-Coburg and Gotha
7. Princess Alice of the United Kingdom
15. Queen Victoria of the United Kingdom

== Bibliography ==
- Bradford, Sarah (1989), King George VI, London: Weidenfeld and Nicolson, ISBN 0-297-79667-4
- Clogg, Richard (1979), A Short History of Modern Greece, Cambridge: Cambridge University Press, ISBN 0-521-22479-9
- Eilers, Marlene A. (1987), Queen Victoria's Descendants, Baltimore, Maryland: Genealogical Publishing Co.
- Macmillan, Harold (1984), War Diaries, London: Macmillan, ISBN 0-333-39404-6
- Ruvigny, Marquis of (1914), The Titled Nobility of Europe, London: Harrison and Sons
- Van der Kiste, John (1994), Kings of the Hellenes, Stroud, Gloucestershire, England: Alan Sutton Publishing, ISBN 0-7509-0525-5
- Vickers, Hugo (2000), Alice, Princess Andrew of Greece, London: Hamish Hamilton, ISBN 0-241-13686-5 (The official biography by Vickers is the only English-language book-length biography of Princess Alice.)
- Woodhouse, C. M. (1968), The Story of Modern Greece, London: Faber and Faber
- Ziegler, Philip (1985), Mountbatten, London: Collins, ISBN 0-00-216543-0
