= Princess Margarita of Greece and Denmark =

Greek and Danish princess (1905–1981)

Margarita
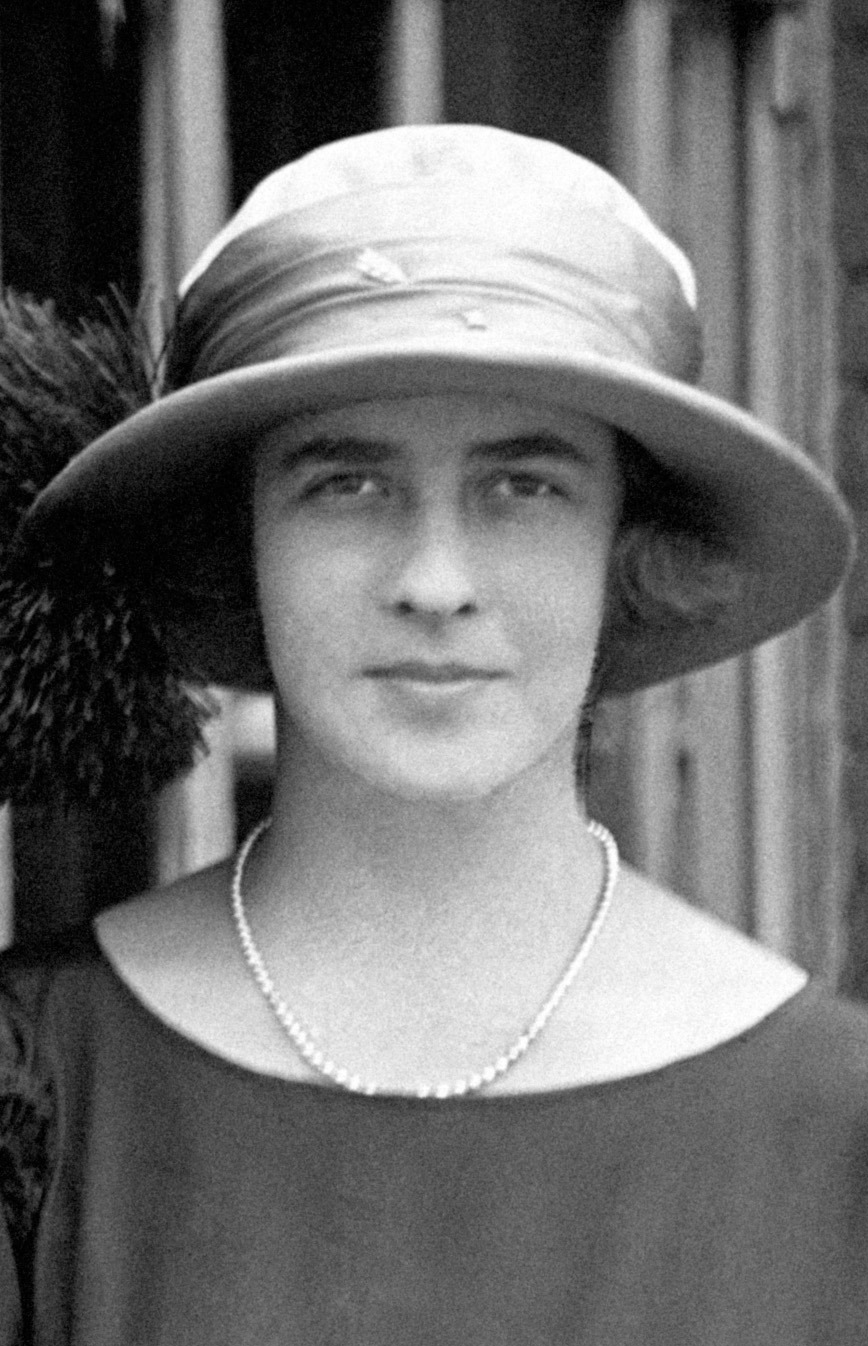
- Margarita in 1923

Princess consort of Hohenlohe-Langenburg
- Tenure: 11 December 1950 – 11 May 1960
- Born: 18 April 1905; Old Royal Palace, Athens, Greece
- Died: 24 April 1981 (aged 76); Bad Wiessee, Bavaria, Germany
- Burial: 30 April 1981; Langenburg, Germany
- Spouse: Gottfried, Prince of Hohenlohe-Langenburg (m. 1931; died 1960)
- Issue: Kraft, Prince of Hohenlohe-Langenburg; Princess Beatrix; Prince Georg Andreas; Prince Rupprecht; Prince Albrecht
- House: Glücksburg
- Father: Prince Andrew of Greece and Denmark
- Mother: Princess Alice of Battenberg

Princess Margarita of Greece and Denmark, Princess of Hohenlohe-Langenburg (Greek: Μαργαρίτα; 18 April 1905 – 24 April 1981) was a Greek and Danish princess by birth and Princess of Hohenlohe-Langenburg by marriage. An elder sister of Prince Philip, Duke of Edinburgh (husband of Queen Elizabeth II), she was, for a time, linked to the Nazi regime.

The eldest daughter of Prince Andrew of Greece and Denmark and Princess Alice of Battenberg, Margarita spent a happy childhood between Athens and Corfu. In her youth, however, she witnessed the Balkan Wars (1912–1913), followed by the First World War (1914–1918) and the Greco-Turkish War (1919–1922). For the young princess and her relatives, these conflicts had dramatic consequences and led to their exile in Switzerland (between 1917 and 1920), then in France and the United Kingdom (from 1922 to 1936). During their exile, Margarita and her family depended on the generosity of their foreign relatives, in particular Princess George of Greece and Denmark (who offered them accommodation in Saint-Cloud) and Lady Louis Mountbatten (who supported them financially).

At the end of the 1920s, Margarita's mother had a mental health crisis which led to her confinement in a Swiss psychiatric hospital. Shortly after, in 1931, Margarita married Prince Gottfried of Hohenlohe-Langenburg. The couple then moved to Weikersheim Castle, where they raised four sons (Princes Kraft, Georg Andreas, Rupprecht and Albrecht) and a daughter (Princess Beatrix). Members of the Nazi party from 1937, Gottfried and Margarita used their family connections to promote a rapprochement of Nazism within the United Kingdom, though without success. During the 1930s, the couple also made several trips abroad. In particular, she visited New York in 1934 to testify in favor of Gloria Morgan Vanderbilt, Gottfried's former fiancée, in the case between her and her in-laws for the custody of her daughter, also named Gloria.

Affected by the Second World War, which divided her relatives into two factions, Margarita spent time in Langenburg during the conflict. The defeat of Germany and its occupation by the Allies brought new upheavals in the life of Margarita and Gottfried. Though preserved from Soviets, who caused the death of several of their cousins, the couple were ostracized by the British royal family at the time of the marriage of Prince Philip, Margarita's only brother, to Princess Elizabeth of the United Kingdom in 1947. Over the years, the couple were reintegrated into the life of the European elite, as illustrated by their invitation and presence at the coronation of Elizabeth II in 1953, and the princess's presence at the wedding of Juan Carlos, Prince of Asturias, and Princess Sophia of Greece and Denmark in 1962. Widowed in 1960, Margarita witnessed a fire at Langenburg Castle in 1963. The princess died in 1981 and her body was buried in the Hohenlohe-Langenburg family mausoleum. Margarita was the paternal aunt of the Prince of Wales, who later became King Charles III.

== Biography ==
=== Childhood ===
==== In Greece and abroad ====
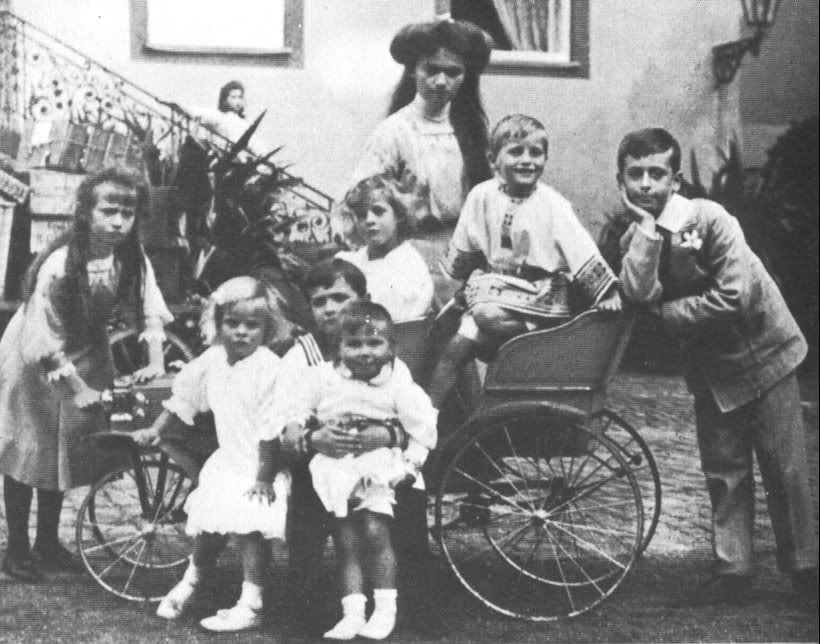
Margarita (in the middle of the cart) surrounded by Maria of Russia (on the stairs), Anastasia of Russia (on the left), Theodora of Greece, Alexei of Russia, Louis of Hesse (in front), Olga of Russia (behind), Georg of Hesse and Louis of Battenberg (right), in 1909

The eldest daughter of Prince Andrew of Greece and Denmark and Princess Alice of Battenberg, Margarita was born at the Royal Palace in Athens on 18 April 1905. Contrary to the custom of the time, her father attended her birth because her grandmother, Queen Olga, believed that "it is only justice that men see the suffering they cause to their wives, and from which they completely escape". Baptized on 11 May in the presence of her maternal grandparents, Margarita grew up surrounded by her father's animals, and within a united household, which rapidly expanded with the arrival of her sisters Theodora (1906–1969), Cecilie (1911–1937), and Sophie (1914–2001). With their mother, Margarita and her sisters communicated in English, but they also used French, German, and Greek in the presence of their relatives and governesses. The princesses were formally educated in English and Greek.

Margarita's early childhood was marked by the instability that the Kingdom of Greece experienced at the beginning of the twentieth century. Tired of attacks from the press and the opposition, Andrew and Alice found refuge in travel and made many stays outside the borders of their home country. With their daughters, they stayed in the United Kingdom, Germany, Malta and Russia, where they reunited with their numerous relatives including Edward VII of the United Kingdom, Ernest Louis, Grand Duke of Hesse, Alexandra Feodorovna, Prince and Princess Louis of Battenberg (Alice's parents), etc. From 1905, Margarita was thus introduced to her young maternal uncle and aunt, Louis and Louise, to whom she and her sister Theodora subsequently became very close.

In 1909, the Goudi coup occurred, a military putsch organized against the government of King George I of Greece, Margarita's grandfather. Shortly after this event, Prince Andrew and his brothers were forced to resign from the army. Concerned about the political situation of their country, Andrew and Alice once again found refuge abroad and stayed in the United Kingdom, France and Hesse. After considering a life in exile for a while, the couple returned to live in Greece, where their third daughter was born.

==== The Balkan Wars and the First World War ====
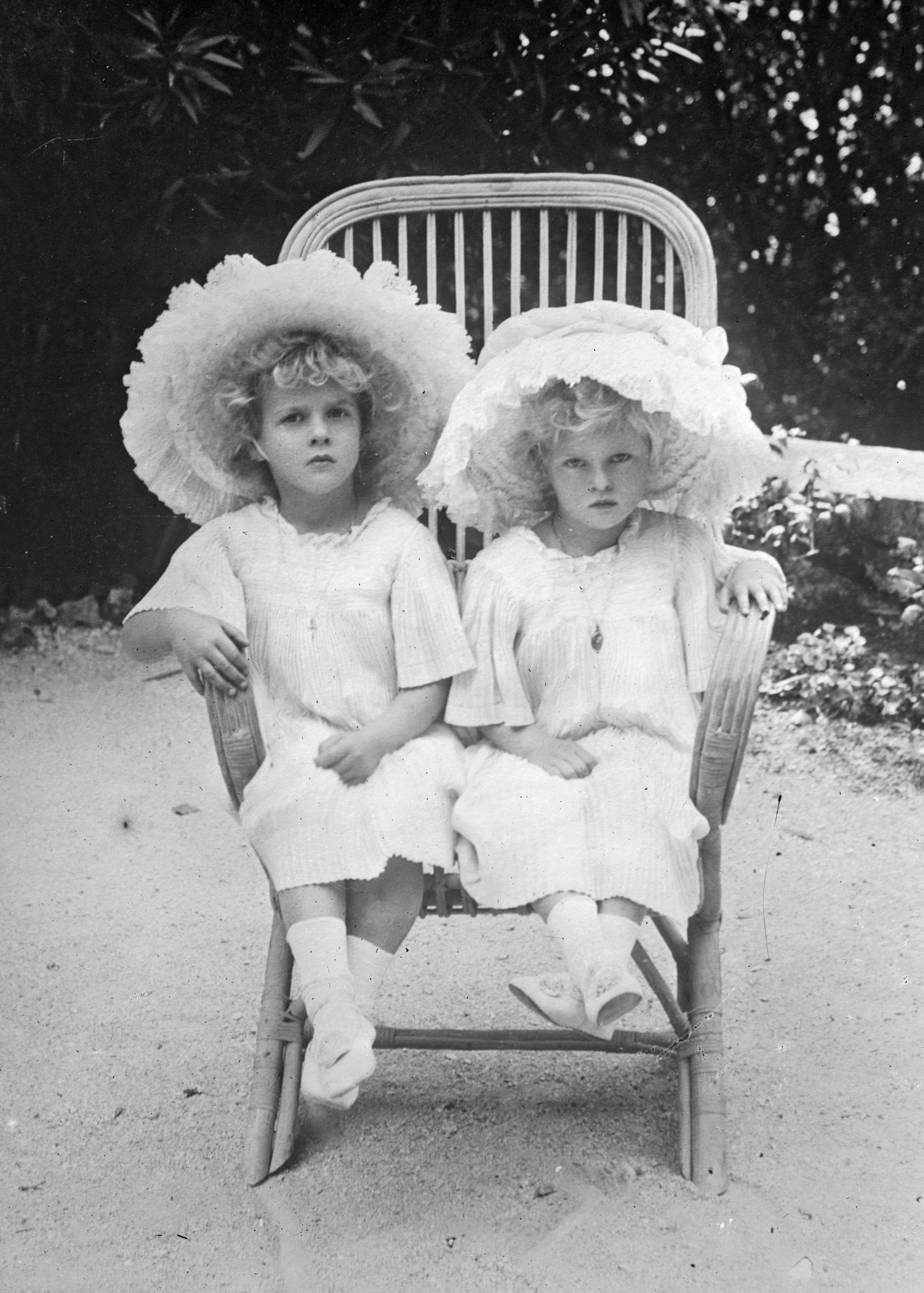
Margarita and Theodora in Corfu, April 1910.

Between 1912 and 1913, Greece engaged in the Balkan Wars, which put the country in opposition to the Ottoman Empire and to Bulgaria. Called to join the army again, Prince Andrew served under Crown Prince Constantine while Princess Alice worked as a nurse for wounded soldiers. Too young to follow their parents, Margarita and her sisters spent the duration of the conflict in Athens, with the exception of a brief stay in Thessaloniki in December 1912. Greece came out of the Balkan Wars with an expanded territory, but the conflict also led to the demise of George I, who was assassinated in March 1913. The death of the King of the Hellenes caused significant changes in the life of Margarita and her relatives. In his will, the sovereign bequeathed the Corfiote palace of Mon Repos to Andrew. After years of living in close proximity to the monarch, in the palaces of Athens and Tatoi, Andrew and his family therefore finally had their own residence.

When peace returned, Andrew, Alice and their daughters left Greece in August 1913. After a visit to Germany, they stayed in the United Kingdom, with Margarita's maternal grandparents. For little princesses, this trip was an opportunity to visit St Paul's Cathedral and London Zoo with their parents. Returning to Greece on 17 November 1913, the family was then retained in the country by Alice's fourth pregnancy and, above all, by the outbreak of the First World War. With Greece having proclaimed its neutrality, this new conflict initially hardly affected Margarita and her relatives. She and her sisters thus spent the summer of 1914 in Corfu, where they enjoyed the sun and the sea for four months.

Things changed as war crept into the life of the country's people. Stationed in Thessaloniki with his garrison, Andrew was thus confronted with the occupation of the city by the Allies in October 1915. Shortly after, in December, the routed Serbian army found refuge in Corfu, leading Alice and her daughters to abandon Mon Repos for the capital. Over the months, the amount of threats against members of the royal dynasty increased. In July 1916, an arsonist attacked the domain of Tatoi, while the king was there with his wife and several of their children. In addition, on 1 December, the French navy bombarded the royal palace in Athens, forcing Margarita and her sisters to take refuge in the cellars with their mother.

==== Exile in Switzerland ====
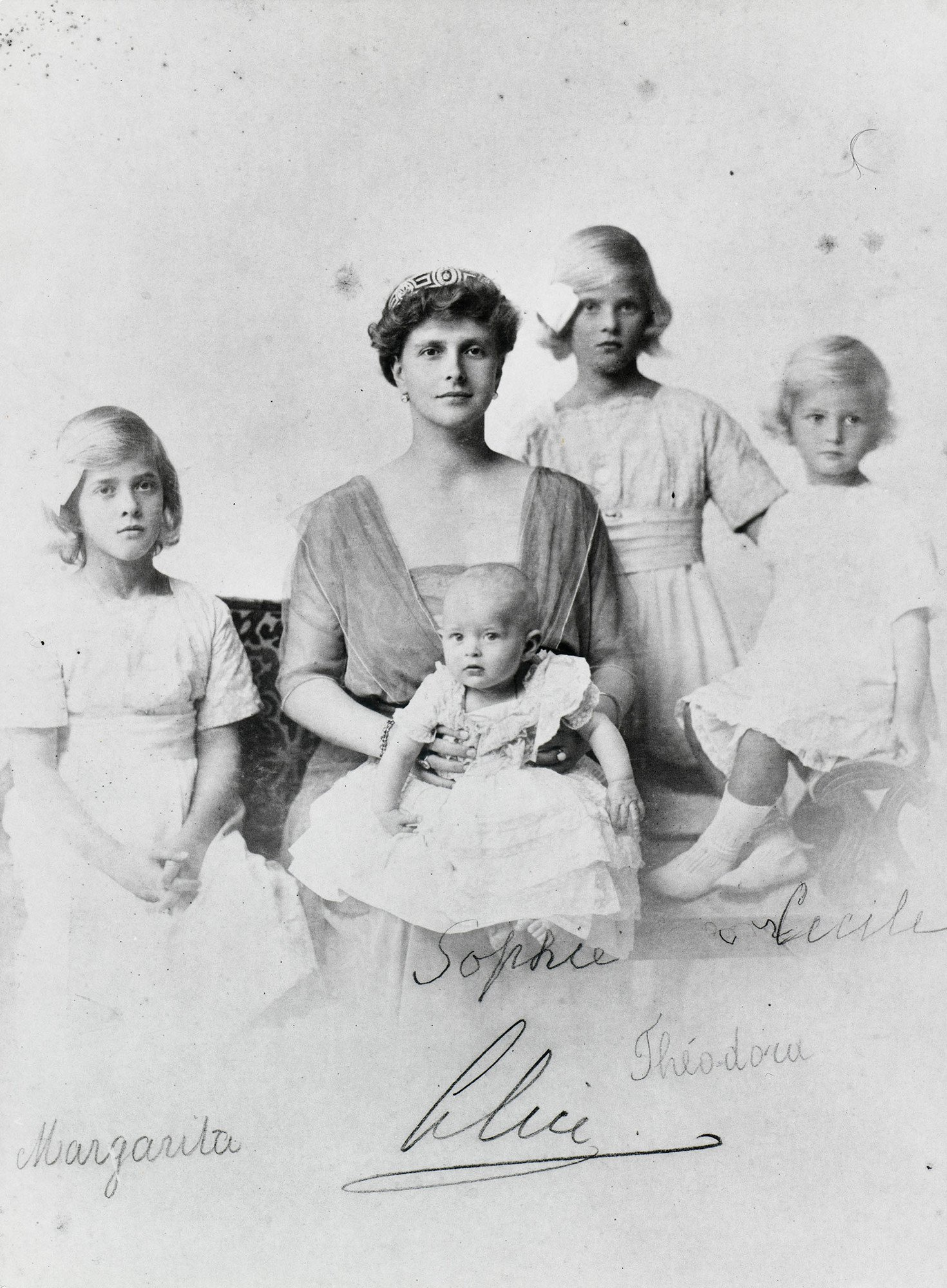
Alice with her four daughters (1914)

In June 1917, King Constantine I was finally deposed and driven out of Greece by the Allies, who replaced him on the throne by his second son, the young Alexander. Fifteen days later, Margarita's family was in turn forced into exile in order to remove the possibility of the new monarch being influenced by those close to him. Forced to reside in German-speaking Switzerland, the small group first stayed in a hotel in St. Moritz, before settling in Lucerne, where they lived with uncertainty about their future.

Exile was not the only source of concern for the family, however. With the fall of the Russian Empire in 1917, several of Margarita's relatives were murdered in Russia. Shortly after these events, the Grand Ducal family of Hesse, to which Margarita was closely related through her mother, was overthrown along with all the other German dynasties during the winter of 1918–1919. Finally, the family went through some health problems, several of them contracting the flu in 1920.

At the beginning of 1919, Margarita nevertheless had the joy of reuniting with her paternal grandmother, the Dowager Queen Olga, spared by the Bolsheviks thanks to the diplomatic intervention of the Danes. In the months that followed, she reconnected, moreover, with her maternal grandparents, whom the war forced to abandon the name of Battenberg for that of Mountbatten. For Margarita, who now formed a duo with her younger sister Theodora, exile was not only synonymous with nostalgia; (Note: In a letter to her uncle Louis Mountbatten, the princess describes in particular how much she misses the Mediterranean Sea, and how tired she is of Swiss "little lakes".(Vickers 2000, p. 142)) it was also an opportunity for long family reunions and walks in the mountains.

=== Young adulthood ===
==== Brief return to Greece ====
On 2 October 1920, King Alexander, cousin of Margarita, was bitten by a domestic monkey during a walk in Tatoi. Poorly cared for, he contracted sepsis, which prevailed on 25 October, without any member of his family being allowed to come to his bedside. The death of the sovereign caused a violent institutional crisis in Greece. Already stuck, since 1919, in a new war against Turkey, Prime Minister Eleftherios Venizelos lost the 1920 Greek legislative election. Humiliated, he retired abroad while a referendum reinstalled Constantine I on the throne.

Prince Andrew was received triumphantly in Athens on 23 November 1920, and his wife and four daughters joined him a few days later. Margarita then returned to live in Corfu with her family. At the same time, Princess Alice found out that she was pregnant again. On 10 June 1921, the family welcomed Philip (1921–2021), the future Duke of Edinburgh. The joy that surrounded this birth, however, was obscured by the absence of Prince Andrew, who joined the Greek forces in Asia Minor during the Occupation of Smyrna. Despite worries about the war, Margarita and her siblings enjoyed life at Mon Repos, where they received a visit from their maternal grandmother and their aunt Louise in the spring of 1922. In the park near the palace, built on an ancient cemetery, the princesses devoted themselves to archeology and discovered some pottery, bronze pieces and bones.

During this period, Margarita and her sisters also participated, for the first time, in a number of great social events. In March 1921, the princesses attended in Athens the wedding of their cousin Helen to Crown Prince Carol of Romania. In July 1922, they went to the United Kingdom to be bridesmaids at the wedding of their uncle Louis Mountbatten to the wealthy heiress Edwina Ashley.

However, the military defeat of Greece against Turkey and the political unrest that it caused disrupted the life of Margarita and her family. In September 1922, Constantine I abdicated in favor of his eldest son, George II. A month later, Prince Andrew was arrested before being tried by a military tribunal, which declared him responsible for the defeat of the Sakarya. Saved from execution by the intervention of foreign chancelleries, the prince was condemned to banishment and cashiering. After a brief stop in Corfu, the prince and his relatives hurriedly left Greece aboard HMS Calypso in early December 1922.

==== Marriage prospects ====
After a journey of several weeks, which led them successively to Italy, France and the United Kingdom, Margarita, her parents and her siblings settled in Saint-Cloud in 1923. Settled in a house adjoining that of Princess Marie Bonaparte, the family depended for seven years on her generosity, and two other aunts of Margarita: first Princess Anastasia and then Edwina, Countess Mountbatten of Burma. Marie Bonaparte financed the studies of her nieces and nephew, while Lady Mountbatten got into the habit of offering her nieces her "used" clothes. In fact, Margarita's parents had little income and the children were the regular witnesses to their money problems and their difficulty in maintaining a household.

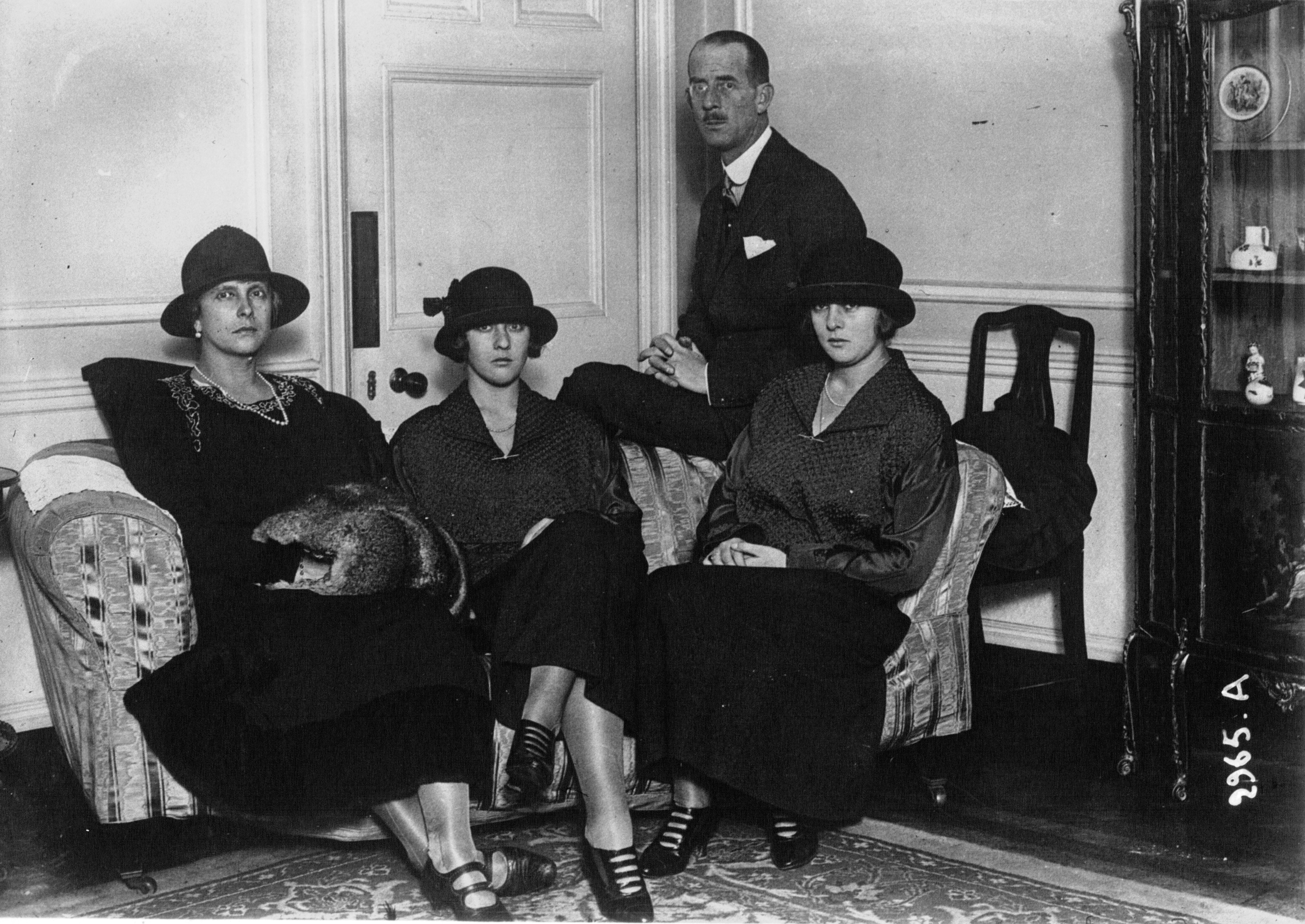
Alice, Theodora, Andrew and Margarita in 1922

Deprived of their Greek nationality after the proclamation of the Second Hellenic Republic in March 1924, Margarita and her family received Danish passports from their cousin King Christian X. Now of marrying age, the princess and her sister Theodora regularly left France for Great Britain, where they lived with their maternal grandmother, the Dowager Marchioness of Milford Haven. With their aunt Louise, who increasingly replaced their mother as a chaperone and confidante, the two young girls attended most of the events by British aristocracy during the 1920s, including balls and dances, birthdays and garden parties at Buckingham Palace, horse races, etc. The two princesses also took advantage of their stays in London to visit their many relatives, such as their paternal grandmother, Queen Olga, who was Queen Alexandra's regular guest at Sandringham. However, the young girls' lack of fortune and their life in exile meant that they hardly had any suitors, which was a matter of concern to their mother Alice. (Note: It seems that Alice's efforts to marry her daughters began in the early 1920s. At that time, the princess was planning to match one of her elder daughters with the wealthy William B. Leeds Jr, son of her sister-in-law Princess Anastasia from her previous marriage, though without success.(Mateos Sainz de Medrano 2004, pp. 283–284))

During the summer of 1926, Margarita met Prince François-Ferdinand d'Isembourg-Birstein, eldest son of Prince François-Joseph d'Isembourg-Birstein, during a stay in Tarasp with her great-uncle Ernest Louis, Grand Duke of Hesse. The two young people enjoyed each other's company and their families met at the beginning of the following year. Margarita was enchanted by her suitor and by the region where he lived. However, François-Ferdinand was of the Catholic faith and the princess refused to give up Orthodox faith, which soon put an end to their romance. Thus, by 1930, neither Margarita nor Theodora had yet found a fiancé. This did not prevent them from rejoicing for their aunt Louise when she was asked by Gustaf Adolf, Crown Prince of Sweden, to marry him in June 1923.

==== Alice's confinement ====
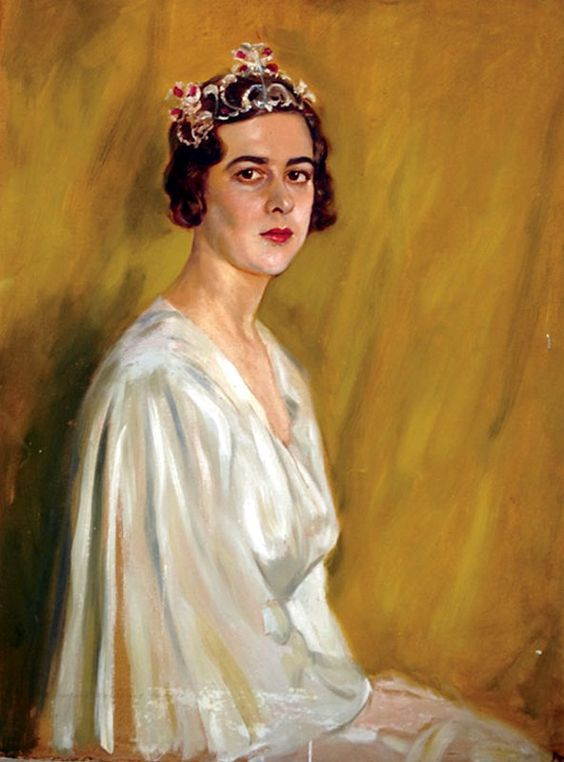
Portrait by Philip de László, 1928

Margarita, Theodora and Philip spent the summer of 1928 in Romania. Invited by Princess Helen, whose son Michael I was the same age as Philip, the two young women and their brother stayed for several weeks in Sinaia. At the time, Prince Nicholas of Romania was still single and Helen would like to see him marry one of her relatives, but her plans for her brother-in-law to marry one of her cousins came to nothing.

A few months after this trip, Alice allegedly began to suffer from psychological problems. Struck by a mental health crisis, the prince said that the princess convinced herself she possessed healing powers and that she was receiving divine messages about potential husbands for her daughters. She then took herself for a saint and soon declared herself the bride of Jesus. Prince Andrew finally made the decision to place his wife in a sanatorium, with the agreement of his mother-in-law, the Dowager Marchioness of Milford Haven. During his family's stay in Darmstadt, Germany, in April 1930, he sent Alice to a psychiatric hospital located in Kreuzlingen, Switzerland.

While their family disintegrated, their father took advantage of the situation to abandon their home in Saint-Cloud and to settle at the French Riviera with his mistress. Margarita's two youngest sisters were married successively to German princes. Sophie married Prince Christoph of Hesse in December 1930, followed by Cecilie who married Georg Donatus, Hereditary Grand Duke of Hesse in February 1931. After years of celibacy, Margarita and Theodora were quick to marry in their turn.

=== Settling in Germany and stays abroad ===
==== Family life and adherence to Nazism ====
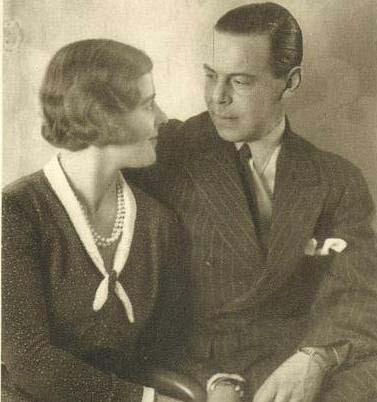
Princess Margarita and Prince Gottfried

In 1930, Margarita was 25 when she met Gottfried ("Friedel"), hereditary prince of Hohenlohe-Langenburg, who like her descended from Queen Victoria of the United Kingdom. Coming from the House of Hohenlohe, whose states were mediatised at the beginning of the 19th century, the prince was heir to a fortune made up of castles, farmland and forests. Margarita and Gottfried fell in love and married on 20 April 1931. (Note: This date corresponded to the 35th wedding anniversary of Gottfried's parents (Zeepvat 1993, p. 261).) Organized at Langenburg Castle, their wedding consisted of a double religious ceremony, both Lutheran and Orthodox. The occasion was a large family reunion, at which Margarita's mother Alice was not present. Among the many guests were the Dowager Queen Marie of Romania and Grand Duchess Victoria Feodorovna of Russia (aunts of the groom) as well as Prince George of Greece and Denmark and Louise, Crown Princess of Sweden (uncle and aunt of the bride).

Once their marriage was celebrated, Margarita and Gottfried settled at Weikersheim Castle, located not far from the town of Langenburg. After a stillbirth in 1933, Margarita gave birth to three children: Kraft (1935–2004), Beatrix (1936–1997), and Georg Andreas (1938–2021). Concerned about her mother's fate, Margarita visited her several times in Kreuzlingen, and their reunion was often filled with emotions. However, Alice was angry with those close to her for having her placed in an asylum and, once released from there in 1933, she made known her desire to stay away from her family. Four years passed before she put an end to her voluntary exile. The reconciliation of the princess and her children finally happened in 1937, and Margarita saw her mother for the first time in July. A few months later, in November, her sister Cecilie was killed in a plane crash and the family reunited for her funeral in Darmstadt.

When she was not taking care of those close to her, Margarita was involved in charitable works, which soon earned her the admiration of the inhabitants of the former principality of Hohenlohe-Langenburg. Like several members of her entourage, (Note: Cecilie (her sister), Princess Alexandra of Saxe-Coburg and Gotha (her mother-in-law), Princesses Irma and Marie Melita of Hohenlohe-Langenburg (her sisters-in-law) as well as Georg Donatus, Hereditary Grand Duke of Hesse, and Wilhelm Friedrich, Duke of Schleswig-Holstein (her brothers-in-law) also joined the party on the same day (Petropoulos 2006, pp. 382, 386) Ernst II, Prince of Hohenlohe-Langenburg (her father-in-law) and Prince Christoph of Hesse (another brother-in-law) have already been members since 1936 and 1931, respectively (Petropoulos 2006, pp. 381, 382).) Margarita joined the Nazi Party on 1 May 1937 at the same time as her husband. Thereafter, the couple used their family connections to promote the rapprochement of the Nazi regime in the United Kingdom. Enlisted in the Wehrmacht, Gottfried participated in the Anschluss in 1938.

==== Gloria Vanderbilt affair ====
In October 1934, Gottfried and Margarita visited New York to testify in favor of Gloria Morgan Vanderbilt in the lawsuit involving her and her in-laws for the custody of her daughter Gloria Vanderbilt.

A few years before his marriage to Margarita, Gottfried had an affair with the wealthy American widow, whom he even almost married with the blessing of his parents. For her part, Margarita visited Gloria Morgan Vanderbilt at her aunt Nadejda Mountbatten's place. However, the in-laws of Gloria Morgan Vanderbilt accused her of having abandoned her daughter by leading a dissolute life with Gottfried in Europe. Margarita further suspected the young woman of having a romantic relationship with Nadejda. Margarita therefore had interest in restoring the honor of her family by participating in the trial with her husband.

In spite of the testimonies of the Prince and the Princess of Hohenlohe-Langenburg, who assured the good morality of their friend in front of the press and in court, Gloria Morgan Vanderbilt lost the lawsuit. Her daughter was then placed in the care of her paternal aunt, Gertrude Vanderbilt Whitney, until she came of age. Gottfried and Margarita left the United States in early November to attend the wedding of Marina, cousin of the princess, and the Duke of Kent in London.

==== Travel to Greece ====
While Germany sank into dictatorship from 1933, the Hellenic Republic was overthrown by General Kondylis in October 1935. A month later, King George II, Margarita's cousin, was reinstalled on the throne after a referendum.

At the beginning of 1936, the banishment sentence issued in 1922 against Margarita's father Prince Andrew was lifted, which allowed him to stay in his country again. A regular target for the Hellenic press, the prince however chose to stay abroad for most of the year. Estranged from her husband since her confinement, Princess Alice made the choice to return and live in Athens, where she settled in November 1938.

In the meantime, Margarita also returned to Greece with Gottfried on the occasion of the marriage of Crown Prince Paul to Princess Frederica of Hanover in January 1938.

=== Second World War and subsequent events ===
==== Family torn apart by war ====
The outbreak of the Second World War greatly affected Margarita, whose family found themselves divided by the conflict. While her husband and brothers-in-law Prince Christoph of Hesse and Berthold, Margrave of Baden, joined the German ranks, her brother Philip fought in the British Royal Navy. The invasion and occupation of France by Germany also block Prince Andrew on the French Riviera and contacting him became very difficult. As for Princess Alice, she refused to leave Greece at the time of invasion and spent most of the conflict in Athens helping refugees and hiding Jews, though she managed to pay a few visits to her daughters in 1940, 1942, and 1944.

Margarita spent the duration of the conflict with her children in Langenburg, a small town far from the zones of combat and where the family did not suffer much deprivation. There, she gave birth to twins, Rupprecht and Albrecht, on 7 April 1944. Gottfried's journey during this period was much more nebulous. According to the Spanish biographer Ricardo Mateos Sainz de Medrano, the Prince of Hohenlohe-Langenburg was wounded during the Battle of Amiens and he spent the remainder of the conflict with his family in Langenburg. However, according to British biographer Hugo Vickers, Gottfried was only a reserve officer at this time and he spent the summer of 1940 in Bohemia with his wife. A rumor was subsequently spread by the English press, but later denied by all historians, asserting that Gottfried spent the war on the Eastern Front, where he was wounded, until his dismissal from the army in 1944 because of his participation in the assassination attempt against Adolf Hitler, This supposed participation has not been attested by any specialists in the subject. (Note: Historian Jonathan Petropoulos did not identify any individual of royal blood among the conspirators of 1944.(Petropoulos 2006, p. 277)) More credible is therefore the version given by the Hohenloher Tagblatt in an article devoted to the prince in 2010. Seriously wounded on the Eastern Front, where he commanded a reconnaissance unit until 1944, Gottfried was dismissed from the army at the continuation of the decree banning people of royal descent from serving in the army. Back in Langenburg, the prince transformed the family castle into a hospital, before welcoming refugees there.

The war period brought its share of mourning for Margarita's family. In April 1942, her mother-in-law, the Dowager Princess of Hohenlohe-Langenburg, died in Schwäbisch Hall after a long illness. A little over a year later, in October 1943, Prince Christoph, husband Margarita's sister Sophie, was killed in a plane crash while flying over the Apennine Mountains. Finally, in December 1944, her father Prince Andrew died in Monaco without having been able to see his children again.

==== Post-war years ====
The defeat of Germany and its occupation by the Allies brought new upheavals in the life of the former German princely families, several of whom (such as Hermine Reuss of Greiz, Joachim Ernst, Duke of Anhalt, or Georg, Prince of Saxe-Meiningen) perished in hands of the Soviets. When the war ended, Margarita and her family found themselves in the American-occupied part of Germany, so their lives were not under threat. (Note: This relative security did not prevent the British government from later establishing a plan to secure the relatives of Princess Elizabeth (later Queen Elizabeth II) and Prince Philip in the event of a Soviet invasion of West Germany. See Fenton, Ben (9 May 2006). "How Britain planned to rescue 'royal relatives'". The Daily Telegraph.) Gottfried was quickly appointed provisional administrator of the district of Crailsheim.

After peace was restored, the revelation of the war crimes of the Wehrmacht and their role in the Holocaust—brought to light during the Nuremberg trials—had serious repercussions on the relationship between the Hohenlohe-Langenburgs and their foreign relatives. Despite her own Germanic origins, Princess Alice of Battenberg thus developed a deep disgust for the German people and refused, until 1949, to return to stay in her daughters' country. For his part, Prince Philip (officially renamed Philip Mountbatten in 1947) found himself unable to invite his sisters on the occasion of his marriage to Princess Elizabeth of the United Kingdom because of anti-German sentiment prevailing in Great Britain after the war.

Aware of the difficulties their brother had to face, Margarita, Theodora and Sophie considered their sidelining wrong and hurtful. They felt snubbed when they realized that their cousins, the Queen Mother of the Romanians and the Duchess of Aosta, had been invited despite their countries being allies of the Nazi regime during the conflict. Harassed by the press, who submitted requests for interviews with them, Margarita and her sisters spent the day of 20 November 1947 at Marienburg Castle with their families. Invited by the Duke and Duchess of Brunswick, they celebrated the union of their brother in the company of their cousin Princess Elizabeth of Greece and Denmark and Prince Louis and Princess Margaret of Hesse and by Rhine. A few days later, the Greek princesses received a visit from the Queen of the Hellenes (who came to bring them a letter from their mother Princess Alice describing the wedding in detail) and the Duchess of Kent.

=== Return to normal life ===
==== Reintegration into royal circles ====
In March 1948, Margarita and her three elder children were invited to Athens by Princess Alice, who offered them the trip thanks to the pension that the Countess Mountbatten of Burma continued to pay her. Invited to stay at the Royal Palace by King Paul and Queen Frederica, Margarita was delighted to be back in her home country. In the years that followed, the Hohenlohe-Langenburgs made several other stays in Greece. In 1954, they took part in the "Cruise of the Kings". In 1962, the Princess attended the wedding of Princess Sophia of Greece and Denmark and Juan Carlos, Prince of Asturias. Finally, in 1963, she attended the festivities organized as part of the centenary of the Hellenic dynasty.

The Greek royal family was not the only royal house to show its desire to reconnect with the Hohenlohe-Langenburgs. In 1950, Margarita was allowed to return to the United Kingdom on the occasion of the funeral of her grandmother, the Dowager Marchioness of Milford Haven. A few months later, the princess was chosen to be one of the godmothers of her niece, Princess Anne. Above all, in 1953, Margarita, her sisters, their husbands and some of their children were invited to the coronation of Elizabeth II. Satisfied not to have been sidelined once again, the Princess of Hohenlohe-Langenburg nonetheless noted with sadness the anguish of her brother Philip, who considered with apprehension his new status as prince consort.

In the 1950s, Margarita and her husband also visited Spain on several occasions. There they found various members of Gottfried's relatives: Princess Beatrice of Saxe-Coburg and Gotha and her husband Infante Alfonso, Duke of Galliera (maternal aunt and uncle of the prince), Princess Alexandra of Hohenlohe-Langenburg (sister of the prince), as well as Prince Alfonso of Hohenlohe-Langenburg and his wife Ira von Fürstenberg (distant cousins of the prince).

==== Life in Langenburg ====
In December 1950, Prince Ernest II, Margarita's father-in-law, died and Gottfried succeeded him as head of the House of Hohenlohe. The prince then inherited a substantial fortune, made up of agricultural land and forests, but also of two castles (Langenburg and Weikersheim), both very expensive to maintain. Eager to diversify his income, Gottfried joined forces with several aristocrats to found a timber import company. The prince also sought to develop tourism in the former principality of Hohenlohe-Langenburg. After opening a cafeteria in the gardens of Langenburg castle, he transformed a wing of it into guest rooms for wealthy foreigners.

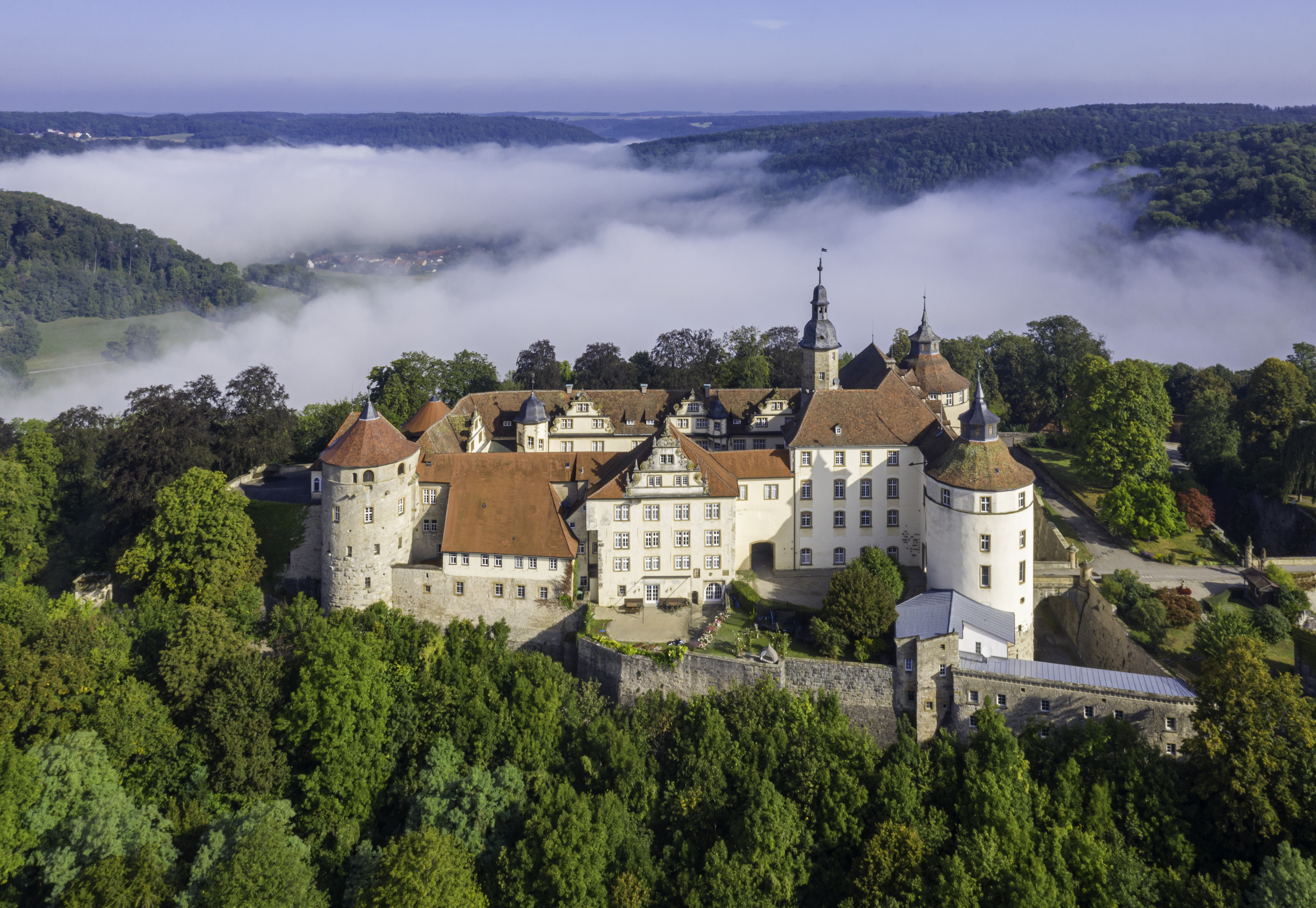
Langenburg Castle (2019)

Beginning in the 1930s, Margarita gained a lot of weight, which was of concern to those close to her. At the end of the 1950s, however, Gottfried's state of health deteriorated and he died on 11 May 1960, making Prince Kraft, his eldest son, the new head of the house of Hohenlohe. Very affected by the demise of her husband, Margarita nevertheless followed the advice of her mother, who recommended her not to withdraw and to take a more active part in social life. In 1961, the princess thus attended the wedding of Prince Edward, Duke of Kent, and Katharine Worsley. Shortly after, she was present a reception in honor of US President John F. Kennedy at Buckingham Palace.

In January 1963, a fire broke out in Langenburg Castle. There were no casualties but the private apartments of the princess and many of her personal objects were destroyed. The damage to the building was considerable and forced Prince Kraft to sell Weikersheim Castle in 1967 to finance the renovation work. This did not prevent the Hohenlohe-Langenburgs from receiving Queen Elizabeth II and Prince Philip in their castle during their official trip to West Germany in 1965.

For Margarita, the 1960s saw the marriages of two of her children. In 1965, Prince Kraft married Princess Charlotte von Croÿ. Then, in 1969, Prince Georg Andreas married Princess Luise von Schönburg-Waldenburg. The engagement of Princess Beatrix to her nephew Maximilian, Margrave of Baden, son of Princess Theodora, on the other hand broke off in 1961 and the princess remained unmarried all her life. This event did not prevent Margarita from remaining close to her sister until her death in October 1969. Devastated by the loss of her younger sister, who was only one year younger than her, Margarita also lost her mother Alice two months later.

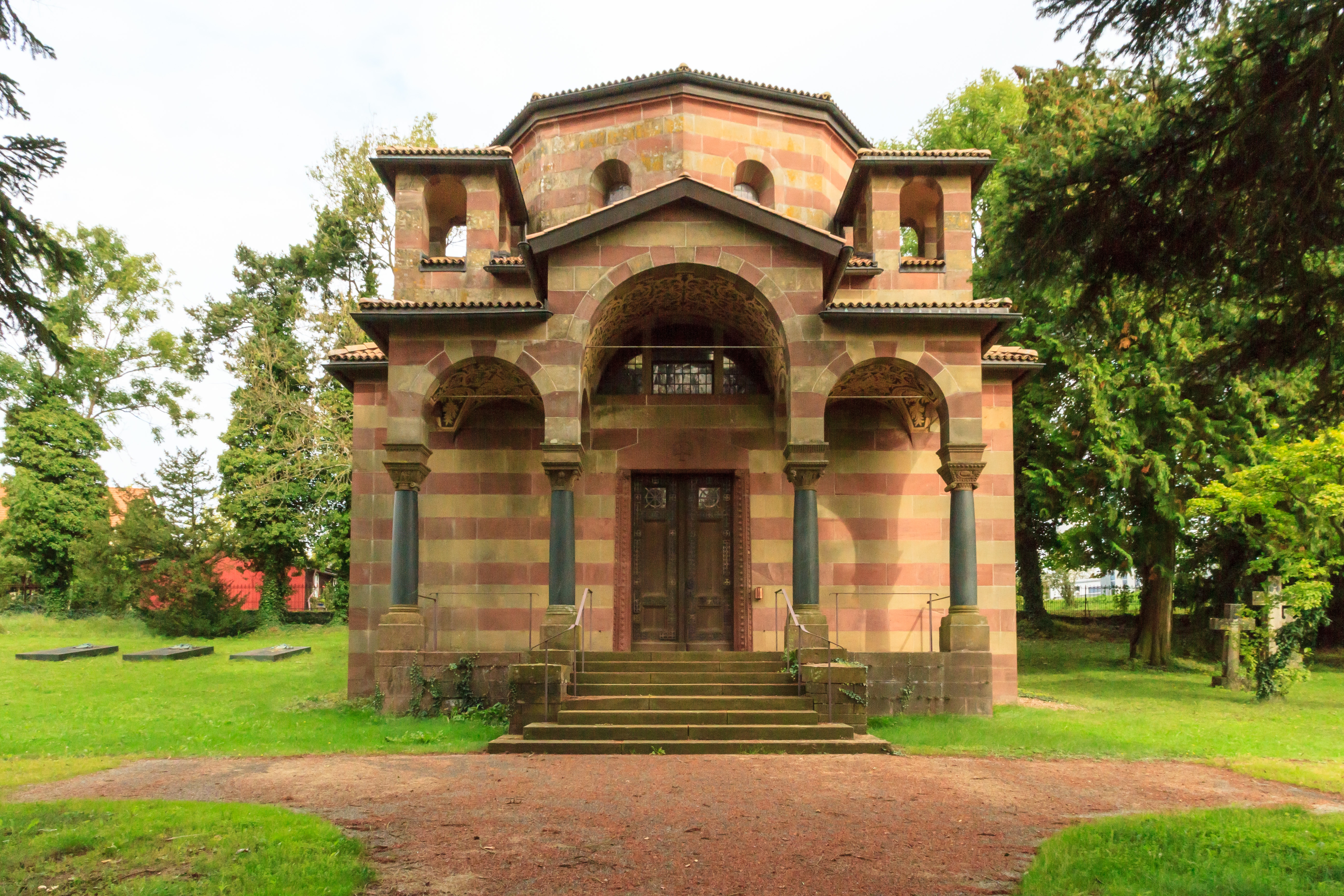
The Hohenlohe-Langenburg family mausoleum, not far from which is Margarita's tomb.

==== Final years ====
Margarita's son Albrecht married Maria Hildegard-Fischer in 1976. His twin brother, Rupprecht, took his own life in 1978. (Note: Prince Albrecht also committed suicide in 1992 (Beéche & Miller 2020, p. 164).)

Margarita died on 24 April 1981 at a clinic in Bad Wiessee, Bavaria, from congestive heart failure, just six days after her 76th birthday. Attended by her brother the Duke of Edinburgh, her funeral took place in Langenburg, where she was interred beside her husband.

== Archives ==
Margarita's personal papers (including family correspondence and photographs) are preserved in the Hohenlohe-Langenburg family archive (Nachlass Fürstin Margarita, HZAN La 148), which is in the Hohenlohe Central Archive (Hohenlohe-Zentralarchiv Neuenstein) in Neuenstein Castle in the town of Neuenstein, Baden-Württemberg, Germany.

== Ancestry ==
Ancestors of Princess Margarita of Greece and Denmark

8. Christian IX of Denmark
4. George I of Greece
9. Princess Louise of Hesse-Kassel
2. Prince Andrew of Greece and Denmark
10. Grand Duke Konstantin Nikolayevich of Russia
5. Grand Duchess Olga Constantinovna of Russia
11. Princess Alexandra of Saxe-Altenburg
1. Princess Margarita of Greece and Denmark
12. Prince Alexander of Hesse and by Rhine
6. Prince Louis of Battenberg
13. Countess Julia Hauke
3. Princess Alice of Battenberg
14. Louis IV, Grand Duke of Hesse
7. Princess Victoria of Hesse and by Rhine
15. Princess Alice of the United Kingdom

== Bibliography ==
=== On Margarita and the Greek royal family ===
- Mateos Sainz de Medrano, Ricardo (2004). La Familia de la Reina Sofía: La Dinastía griega, la Casa de Hannover y los reales primos de Europa (in Spanish). Madrid: La Esfera de los Libros. ISBN 84-9734-195-3.
- Van der Kiste, John (1994). Kings of the Hellenes: The Greek Kings, 1863–1974. Sutton Publishing. ISBN 0-7509-2147-1.

=== On Margarita and her German relatives ===
- Beéche, Arturo E.; Miller, Ilana D. (2020). The Grand Ducal House of Hesse. Eurohistory. ISBN 978-1-9442-0708-3.
- Hannig, Alma; Winkelhofer-Thyri, Martina (2013). Die Familie Hohenlohe: Eine europäische Dynastie im 19. und 20. Jahrhundert (in German). Cologne: Verlag Böhlau. ISBN 978-3-41222201-7.
- Petropoulos, Jonathan (2006). Royals and the Reich: The Princes von Hessen in Nazi Germany. Oxford University Press. ISBN 978-0-19-533927-7.
- Zeepvat, Charlotte (March 1993). "The other one: Alexandra of Hohenlohe-Langenburg". Royalty Digest Quarterly. ISSN 1653-5219.

=== Biographies of Margarita's relatives ===
- Bertin, Celia (1999). Marie Bonaparte (in French). Paris: Perrin. ISBN 2-262-01602-X.
- Delorme, Philippe (2017). Philippe d'Édimbourg: Une vie au service de Sa Majesté (in French). Paris: Tallandier. ISBN 979-10-210-2035-1.
- Eade, Philip (2012). Young Prince Philip: His Turbulent Early Life. HarperPress. ISBN 978-0-00-730539-1.
- Heald, Tim (1991). The Duke: A Portrait of Prince Philip. London: Hodder and Stoughton. ISBN 0-340-54607-7.
- Vickers, Hugo (2000). Alice: Princess Andrew of Greece. London: Hamish Hamilton. ISBN 978-0-241-13686-7.

=== On the Vanderbilt affair ===
- Goldsmith, Barbara (1981). Little Gloria... Happy at Last. Dell. ISBN 0-440-15120-1.
