= Margaret Campbell Geddes =

Margaret
- Princess of Hesse and by Rhine
- Born: Margaret Campbell Geddes; 18 March 1913; Dublin, Ireland, United Kingdom
- Died: 26 January 1997 (aged 83); Schloß Wolfsgarten, Hesse, Germany
- Burial: New Mausoleum, Rosenhöhe Park, Darmstadt, Hesse, Germany
- Spouse: Louis, Prince of Hesse and by Rhine (m. 1937; died 1968)
- House: Hesse-Darmstadt (by marriage)
- Father: Auckland Geddes, 1st Baron Geddes
- Mother: Isabella Gamble Ross

Margaret, Princess of Hesse and by Rhine (born Margaret Campbell Geddes; 18 March 1913 – 26 January 1997) was the wife of Louis, Prince of Hesse and by Rhine, the last prince of the House of Hesse-Darmstadt. Born in Ireland, she became a noted art patron in her adopted homeland of Germany.

== Early life ==
Margaret was born in Dublin on 18 March 1913 to Auckland Campbell Geddes, later 1st Baron Geddes, and his wife, Isabella Gamble Ross (1881–1962). Her father was a member of David Lloyd George's coalition government during World War I and who later served as Ambassador to the United States.

In her book Noble Endeavours, Miranda Seymour describes the circumstances of how and when Margaret Geddes first met Louis, Prince of Hesse and by Rhine (in German: Ludwig von Hessen und bei Rhein) and the development of the relationship.

"Margaret Geddes, a young Scotswoman who was known to one and all as 'Peg', travelled out to Germany towards the end of 1935 in order to join two beloved brothers at a pension [in Grainau] in Bavaria. Unknown to Peg, a little advance plotting had been going on. Waiting to meet her at the local station in the place of her brothers and all ready to conduct her to Haus Hirth was a dark-haired and extremely good-looking young German. His name was Ludwig ('Lu') and he was the music-loving second son of Grand Duke Ernst of Hessen-Darmstadt [the last Grand Duke of Hesse]…

"While Peg's younger brother, David, went off on cultural trips around the Bavarian towns…, Peg spent most of her time with Lu. The result, as Prince Ludwig came from a family who had always used English as their preferred language, was that Peg's German grammar progressed less well than did her romance with a kind, sensitive and humorous young man.[endnote]" Although she was born a commoner, they later became engaged. The wedding date was set for 20 November 1937. Planning continued despite the groom's father's death on 9 October.

== Marriage ==
On 16 November 1937, while travelling to London for the wedding, Prince Louis' mother, Grand Duchess Eleonore; brother, Hereditary Grand Duke Georg Donatus; sister-in-law, Hereditary Grand Duchess Cecilie; nephews, Prince Louis and Prince Alexander; and Georg Donatus' and Cecilie's newborn child were all killed in the Sabena Junkers Ju 52 Ostend crash over Ostend, Belgium. Louis succeeded his brother as head of the House of Hesse and by Rhine. Her sister-in-law Cecilie, who had died in the plane crash, was a sister of Prince Philip, Duke of Edinburgh.

The day after the crash, on 17 November 1937, Margaret and Louis were married at St Peter's Church, Eaton Square. The newlyweds were dressed in mourning and swiftly returned to Darmstadt for the funerals. The couple had no children but adopted Louis' niece, Princess Johanna, after her parents were killed in the crash. She died of meningitis in 1939 at the age of 2.

After their marriage, Margaret and her husband moved to Schloß Wolfsgarten near Frankfurt. Margaret continued to work for the German Red Cross and made Wolfsgarten available as a military hospital during the Second World War. From 1957, she was vice-president of the Red Cross of Hesse and from 1958, a member of the Federal Executive Committee of the German Red Cross for two decades. She was also chairwoman of the Alice-Hospital and the Eleonoren-Kinderklinik (Eleonora Children's Clinic). These were merged and renamed the Darmstädter Kinderkliniken Prinzessin Margaret (Darmstadt Children's Clinic Princess Margaret) after her death in 1997. She also devoted herself to the arts and museums in Darmstadt.

Margaret and her husband, affectionately known to family as Peg and Lu, are credited with helping the British royal family reestablish connections with their German relations after World War II. Queen Elizabeth II and Prince Philip called on Margaret and Louis at Wolfsgarten on 20 May 1965 during a state visit to Germany.

== Later life ==
Louis died in 1968; with his death, the House of Hesse-Darmstadt became extinct. His claim to its ancestral titles and possessions passed to Louis' adopted son Moritz, Landgrave of Hesse, head of the House of Hesse-Kassel. This was the first time all branches of the house had been united under one person since the death of Philip I, Landgrave of Hesse, in 1567.

Margaret maintained close relations with the British royal family, particularly Charles, Prince of Wales, whose 1981 wedding to Lady Diana Spencer she attended and who attended her 70th and 80th birthday celebrations in 1983 and 1993, respectively.

Margaret died on 26 January 1997. Her funeral, held on 31 January 1997 at the Stadtkirche Darmstadt, was attended by Queen Anne-Marie of Greece; Prince Philip, Duke of Edinburgh; Charles, Prince of Wales; and Princess George William of Hanover. She was interred in the New Mausoleum in Rosenhöhe Park, Darmstadt, with the rest of the grand-ducal family.

Margaret Campbell Geddes Born: 18 March 1913 Died: 26 January 1997
Titles in pretence
Vacant Title last held by Princess Cecilie of Greece and Denmark	— TITULAR — Grand Duchess of Hesse and by Rhine; 17 November 1937 – 30 May 1968; Reason for succession failure: Grand Duchy abolished in 1918	Extinct
