= Ernest Louis, Grand Duke of Hesse =

Grand Duke of Hesse and by Rhine from 1892 to 1918

Ernest Louis
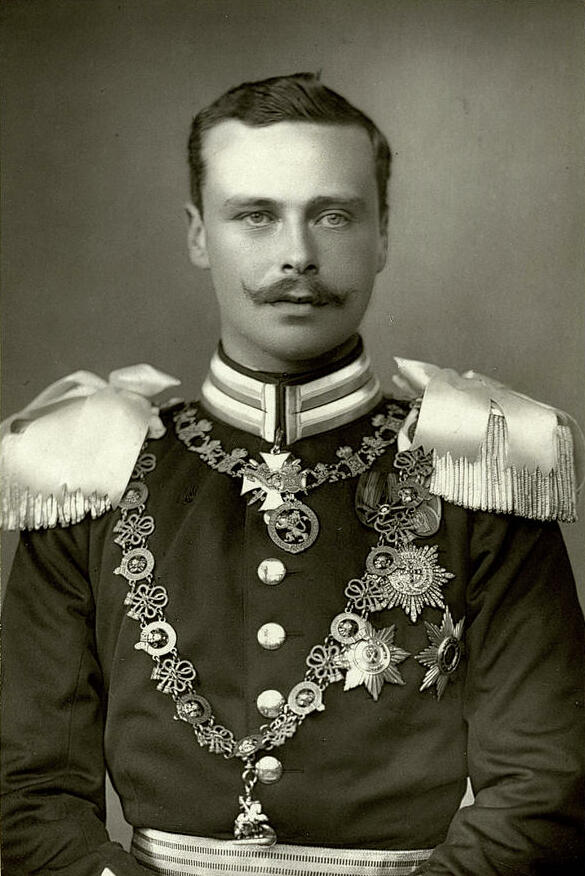
- Ernest Louis wearing the collar of the Order of the Garter

Grand Duke of Hesse and by Rhine
- Reign: 13 March 1892 – 9 November 1918
- Predecessor: Louis IV
- Successor: Monarchy abolished
- Born: 25 November 1868; New Palace, Darmstadt, Grand Duchy of Hesse
- Died: 9 October 1937 (aged 68); Schloss Wolfsgarten, Langen, Hesse, Germany
- Burial: New Mausoleum, Rosenhöhe Park, Darmstadt, Germany
- Spouses: Princess Victoria Melita of Saxe-Coburg and Gotha (m. 1894; div. 1901) Princess Eleonore of Solms-Hohensolms-Lich (m. 1905)
- Issue: Princess Elisabeth; Georg Donatus, Hereditary Grand Duke of Hesse and by Rhine; Louis, Prince of Hesse and by Rhine
Names
- Ernest Louis Charles Albert William; German: Ernst Ludwig Karl Albrecht Wilhelm
- House: Hesse-Darmstadt
- Father: Louis IV, Grand Duke of Hesse and by Rhine
- Mother: Princess Alice of the United Kingdom

Ernest Louis (German: Ernst Ludwig Karl Albrecht Wilhelm; 25 November 1868 – 9 October 1937) was the last Grand Duke of Hesse and by Rhine, reigning from 1892 until 1918. A grandson of Queen Victoria, he was known as a patron of the arts and founded the Darmstadt Artists' Colony. He married Princess Victoria Melita of Edinburgh and later Princess Eleonore of Solms‑Hohensolms‑Lich. During World War I he served at Kaiser Wilhelm II's headquarters and was deposed in the German revolution of 1918–1919.

== Early life ==
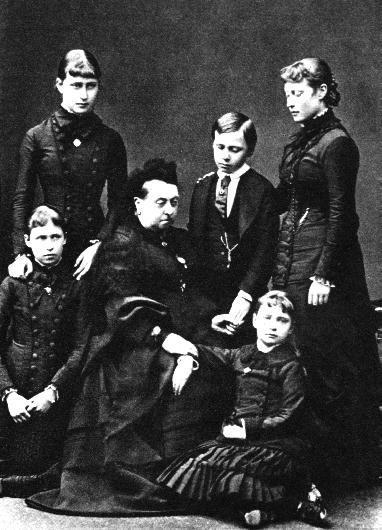
Ernest in 1879 with his grandmother Queen Victoria and sisters Victoria, Elizabeth, Irene and Alix two months after the deaths of their mother and youngest sister. All are wearing mourning clothes.

Ernest Louis was born on 25 November 1868 at the New Palace, Darmstadt, in the Grand Duchy of Hesse, the elder son of Louis IV, Grand Duke of Hesse and by Rhine, and Princess Alice of the United Kingdom, daughter of Queen Victoria and Prince Albert of Saxe-Coburg and Gotha. He was named Louis after his father. His nickname was "Ernie". One of seven siblings, two of whom died in childhood, Ernest grew up with his four surviving sisters in Darmstadt. One of his younger sisters, Alix, married Tsar Nicholas II, the last Emperor of Russia, while another sister, Victoria, became the mother of Queen Louise of Sweden, Louis Mountbatten and Princess Alice of Battenberg, who was the mother of Prince Philip, Duke of Edinburgh.

Ernest Louis grew up in a loving household, with parents who demonstrated their affection for their children, which was unusual for those of their social standing. He became very attached to his parents and siblings, and it was his misfortune that he witnessed several deaths among them during his childhood. When he was four, his only brother, Prince Friedrich died. The two boys had been playing a game when Friedrich, who suffered from haemophilia, fell through a window onto the balcony twenty feet below. Ernest Louis was inconsolable. "When I die, you must die too, and all the others. Why can't we all die together? I don't want to die alone, like Frittie," he told his nurse. To his mother he said, "I dreamt that I was dead and was gone up to Heaven, and there I asked God to let me have Frittie again and he came to me and took my hand."

In 1878, when Ernest was ten, an epidemic of diphtheria swept through Darmstadt. His father and all the children, except Elisabeth, who was visiting her paternal grandmother, fell ill. Alice cared for her sick husband and children, but on 16 November the youngest of them, Marie, died. Alice kept the news from her family for several weeks, until Ernest Louis, who was devoted to little Marie, asked for his sister. When his mother revealed Marie's death, Ernest Louis was overcome with grief. In comforting her grieving son, Alice kissed him. She fell ill within a week and died on 14 December, the anniversary of her own father's death.

Between May 1887 and December 1888, Ernest had his first affair, with Alexander von Frankenberg und Ludwigsdorf (1861-1911). The two men exchanged love poems addressed to "Alex" and "Ernie". Alexander wrote: Ich kann nur an dich denken,/Bei allem was ich thu‘/ Zum Liebsten thut‘s mich lenken/ Und das mein Schatz bist Du ("I can only think of you/ In everything I do/ It leads me to what I love most/ And that, my darling, is you"). Ernest wrote to him:Du weißt es nicht, wie ich dich liebe,/Und wissend würdest du‘s glauben nicht,/Dass in mir wären solche Triebe,/Wovon zu sprechen ich wage nicht ("You don't know how much I love you/ And if you knew, you wouldn't believe/That in me are such urges/ Of which I dare not speak.")

In 1890, Alexander married. Only two years later, Grand Duke Louis died and twenty-three year old Ernest Louis succeeded him as Grand Duke of Hesse. As his father's only surviving son with no legitimate male cousins, it was important for the new Grand Duke to marry and sire an heir. Alexander's great-granddaughter Floria would later marry Donatus, Landgrave of Hesse, Ernest Louis' adopted great-grandson, in 2003.

== Marriages ==
=== First marriage ===
On 19 April 1894, at Schloss Ehrenburg, Ernest Louis married his maternal first cousin, Princess Victoria Melita of Edinburgh, nicknamed "Ducky", the daughter of his mother's brother, Prince Alfred. The match was encouraged by their mutual grandmother, Queen Victoria, who had first suggested it in autumn 1891 when Ducky (who shared a birthday with Ernest Ludwig) was only fifteen years old.

At the wedding, Ernest's youngest surviving sister, Alix, became engaged to marry Tsarevich Nicholas of Russia, and the excitement of that imminent match overshadowed the wedding celebrations.

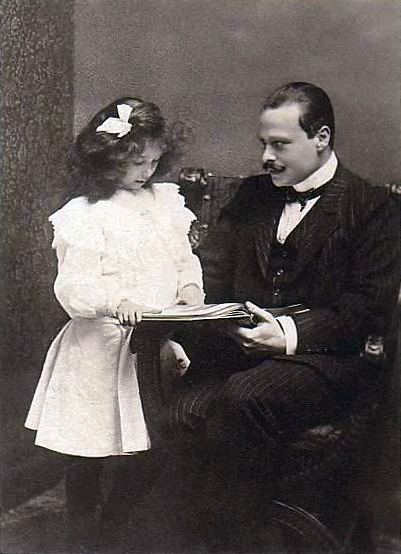
Ernest was still devastated by the memory of his daughter's death thirty years later. "My little Elisabeth," he wrote in his memoirs, "was the sunshine of my life."

Ernest and Victoria Melita had two children:

- a daughter, Elisabeth (11 March 1895 – 16 November 1903). Her early death at age eight from typhoid fever devastated her father, who wrote "My little Elisabeth" in his memoirs "was the sunshine of my life" 30 years after her death.
- stillborn son on 25 May 1900.

Ernest and Victoria entertained in style, frequently holding house parties for young friends under the age of 30, dispensing with formality on those occasions to indulge in fun and frolic. Victoria's cousin, Prince Nicholas of Greece and Denmark, remembered one stay with them as "the jolliest, merriest house party to which I have ever been in my life." These revelries were more in keeping with Victoria's inclinations than Ernest's. Their marriage was unhappy due to differences in temperament and attitude. Fond of revelry, Victoria was less enthusiastic about fulfilling her public role. She avoided answering letters, put off visits to elderly relations whose company she did not enjoy, and talked to people who amused her at official functions while ignoring people of higher social or official standing whom she found boring. Her inattention to her duties provoked quarrels with Ernest Louis. The young couple had loud arguments which sometimes turned physical. Victoria shouted, threw tea trays, smashed china against the wall, and tossed anything at hand at Ernest Louis during their arguments.

Queen Victoria was saddened when she heard of the trouble in the marriage from Sir George Buchanan, her chargé d'affaires in Darmstadt, but because of their daughter Elisabeth she refused to consider permitting her grandchildren to divorce. Ernest also held off from divorce mainly for this reason. He adored his daughter and lavished his time and attention on her. The child reciprocated his affection and preferred the company to that of her mother. Meanwhile, all efforts to rekindle the marriage failed. Victoria spent most of the year in the south of France, spending large sums of money. When Queen Victoria died in January 1901, significant opposition to ending the marriage was removed. The couple were divorced 21 December 1901 on grounds of "invincible mutual antipathy" by a special verdict of the Supreme Court of Hesse. After the divorce, Victoria told some close relatives that Ernest Louis was a homosexual. She allegedly caught her husband in bed with a male servant when, in 1897, she returned home from a visit to her sister Queen Marie of Romania. She did not make her accusation public, but told when her niece Ileana found herself engaged to the homosexual Count Alexander von Hochberg in 1930, she spoke of her own experience with Ernest Louis, and said that "no boy was safe, from the stable hands to the kitchen help. He slept quite openly with them all."

Victoria later married another first cousin, this time on her mother's side in October 1905, while Ernest married his distant cousin, Eleonore of Solms-Hohensolms-Lich

=== Second marriage ===
Ernest Louis remarried in Darmstadt on 2 February 1905, to Princess Eleonore of Solms-Hohensolms-Lich (17 September 1871 – 16 November 1937). This marriage proved harmonious and happy. The couple had two sons:

- Georg Donatus, Hereditary Grand Duke of Hesse (1906–1937). He married his father's grand-niece, Princess Cecilie of Greece and Denmark, a sister of Prince Philip, Duke of Edinburgh, and had issue. The couple and two of their young sons were killed in a plane crash in 1937, leaving behind a daughter who also died two years later while still a child.
- Louis, Prince of Hesse and by Rhine (1908–1968), who married Margaret Campbell Geddes, daughter of Auckland Geddes, 1st Baron Geddes; no issue. Louis adopted Moritz, Landgrave of Hesse, as his heir, thereby uniting the two lines of the Hesse family.

In addition to his marriage, Ernest Louis maintained a close friendship with the bisexual Karl August Lingner, the inventor of Odol, one of the first liquid mouthwashes. When Lingner died of tongue cancer, he bequeathed Tarasp Castle in Switzerland to Ernest Louis. The Hesse family never lived in it, and it was sold in 2016.

== Grand Duke of Hesse ==
In 1892, Ernest Louis succeeded his father as grand duke.

Throughout his life, Ernest Louis was a patron of the arts, founding the Darmstadt Artists' Colony, and was himself an author of poems, plays, essays, and piano compositions.

Ernest Louis commissioned the new mausoleum in 1903. It was consecrated on 3 November 1910, in the presence of him and his immediate family. The remains of Grand Duke Ludwig IV, Princess Alice, Grand Duchess of Hesse and by Rhine, along with their children "Frittie" and "May" were re-interred in the New Mausoleum.

== First World War ==
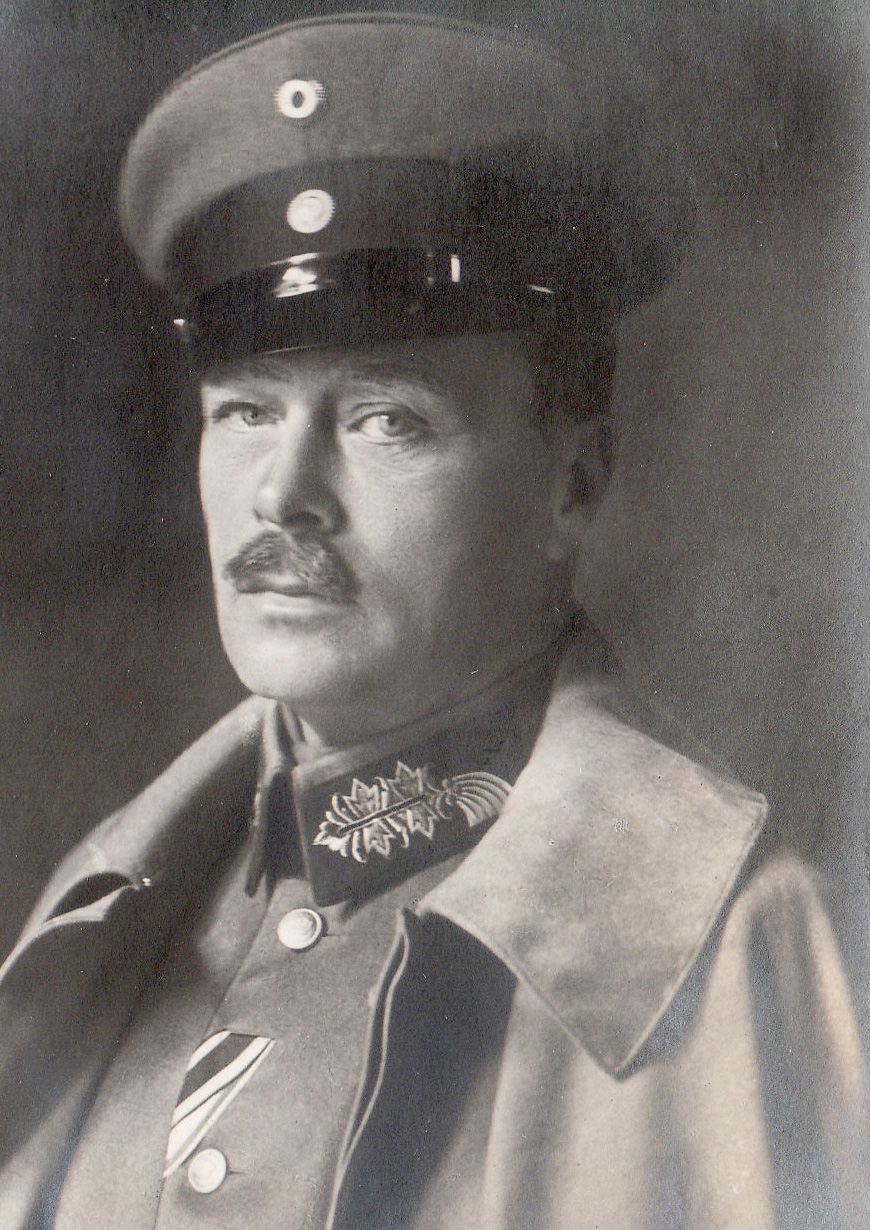
Ernest Louis in 1917, as an officer during the First World War.

During World War I, Ernest Louis served as a general of the infantry at Kaiser Wilhelm II's headquarters. In February, 1917, the February Revolution in Russia forced his brother-in-law, Tsar Nicholas II, to abdicate. Sixteen months later, in July 1918, his two sisters in Russia, Elizabeth, the widow of Grand Duke Sergei Alexandrovich, and Alexandra, the wife of Nicholas II, were murdered by the Bolsheviks, Alexandra dying alongside her husband and children. At the end of the war, during the German revolution of 1918, a workers' and soldiers' council in Darmstadt declared him deposed. He accepted the loss of his throne but refused to formally abdicate.

== Death ==
Ernest Louis died after a long illness at Schloß Wolfsgarten, near Darmstadt on 9 October 1937, aged 68. He received what amounted to a state funeral on 16 November and was buried next to his daughter, Elisabeth, in a new open-air burial ground next to the New Mausoleum he had built in the Rosenhöhe park in Darmstadt. That same day, however, his widow, eldest son, daughter-in-law and grandchildren (except Johanna) were killed in airplane crash in Ostend, Belgium on their way to attend Prince Louis’s wedding.

== Legacy ==
His former sister-in-law, Marie of Romania, described Ernest Louis in her memoirs:

Ernie could be the gayest of companions, he was in fact full of almost feverish life. There was something effervescent about him, rather restless even; he was highly strung and had the artistic temperament developed to the highest degree. He enjoyed everything and could also be a clever inventor of varied amusements.[...] Ernie enjoyed himself as much as we did and, his vitality being infectious, he did Nando a lot of good. In his youth my husband had not the faculty of real enjoyment; he was too anxious and this gave him a somewhat protesting attitude that we did our best to overrule. The truth was he was too much in awe of Uncle; the fear of his “vetoes” was always with him, so he could never “let himself go” to complete enjoyment. Ernie, however, often helped him to overcome his inborn diffidence; the young brother-in-law, so to say, conquered Nando’s doubts with his much greater self-assurance.

Felix Yusupov also described him in his memoirs:

I knew the Grand Duke of Hesse very well, for he had often stayed with us at Arkhangelskoye. He was a very good-looking fellow, gay and attractive. He had a passionate love of beauty and boundless imagination. Having taken it into his head one day that his white pigeons were not in keeping with the old stones of his palace, he had their feathers dyed skye blue. His marriage was not a happy one.

== Honours ==
Ernest Louis received the following orders and decorations:

German honours

- Hesse and by Rhine:
  - Grand Cross of the Ludwig Order
  - Grand Cross of the Merit Order of Philip the Magnanimous
  - Knight of the Golden Lion
  - Founder of the Order of the Star of Brabant, 14 June 1914
- (Duchy of Anhalt) Anhalt: Grand Cross of the Order of Albert the Bear
- Baden:
  - Knight of the House Order of Fidelity, 1888
  - Knight of the Order of Berthold the First, 1888
- Bavaria: Knight of St. Hubert, 1892
- Brunswick: Grand Cross of the Order of Henry the Lion
- (Saxe-Coburg and Gotha) (Duchy of Saxe-Altenburg) (Saxe-Meiningen) Ernestine duchies: Grand Cross of the Saxe-Ernestine House Order
- Mecklenburg: Grand Cross of the Wendish Crown, with Crown in Ore
- Oldenburg: Grand Cross of the Order of Duke Peter Friedrich Ludwig, with Golden Crown and Collar
- Saxe-Weimar-Eisenach: Grand Cross of the White Falcon
- Saxony: Knight of the Rue Crown, 1892
- Württemberg: Grand Cross of the Württemberg Crown, 1893
- Prussia:
  - Knight of the Black Eagle, with Collar 24.05.1888
  - Grand Cross of the Red Eagle
  - Grand Commander's Cross of the Royal House Order of Hohenzollern
- Hohenzollern: Cross of Honour of the Princely House Order of Hohenzollern, 1st Class

Foreign honours

- (Austrian Empire) (Kingdom of Hungary) Austria-Hungary: Grand Cross of the Royal Hungarian Order of St. Stephen, 1893
- Bulgaria: Grand Cross of St. Alexander
- Greece: Grand Cross of the Redeemer
- Italy: Knight of the Annunciation, with Collar, 4 September 1897
  - (Duchy of Parma) Parmese Ducal Family: Grand Cross of the Constantinian Order of St. George
- Montenegro: Grand Cross of the Order of Prince Danilo I
- Romania: Grand Cross of the Star of Romania
- Russia:
  - Knight of St. Andrew, February 1889
  - Knight of St. Alexander Nevsky, February 1889
  - Knight of the White Eagle, February 1889
  - Knight of St. Anna, 1st Class, February 1889
  - Knight of St. Stanislaus, 1st Class, February 1889
  - Knight of St. Vladimir, 4th Class
- (Thailand) Siam: Grand Cross of the White Elephant
- Spain: Knight of the Golden Fleece, 16 July 1910
- United Kingdom:
  - Honorary Grand Cross of the Bath (civil), 21 June 1887 (expelled in 1915)
  - Knight of the Garter, 16 May 1892 (expelled in 1915)
  - Recipient of the Royal Victorian Chain, 10 August 1902 (expelled in 1915)

Ernest Louis, Grand Duke of Hesse House of Hesse-Darmstadt Cadet branch of the House of Hesse Born: 25 November 1868 Died: 9 October 1937
Regnal titles
Preceded by Louis IV	Grand Duke of Hesse and by Rhine; 1892–1918	Vacant Monarchy abolished
Political offices
Preceded by Louis IV as grand duke	Head of state of Hesse-Darmstadt; 1892–1918	Succeeded by Carl Ulrich as president
Titles in pretence
Loss of title Republic declared	— TITULAR — Grand Duke of Hesse and by Rhine; 1918–1937	Succeeded by Georg Donatus
