= 1937 Ostend Sabena Junkers Ju 52 crash =

Aviation accident in Belgium

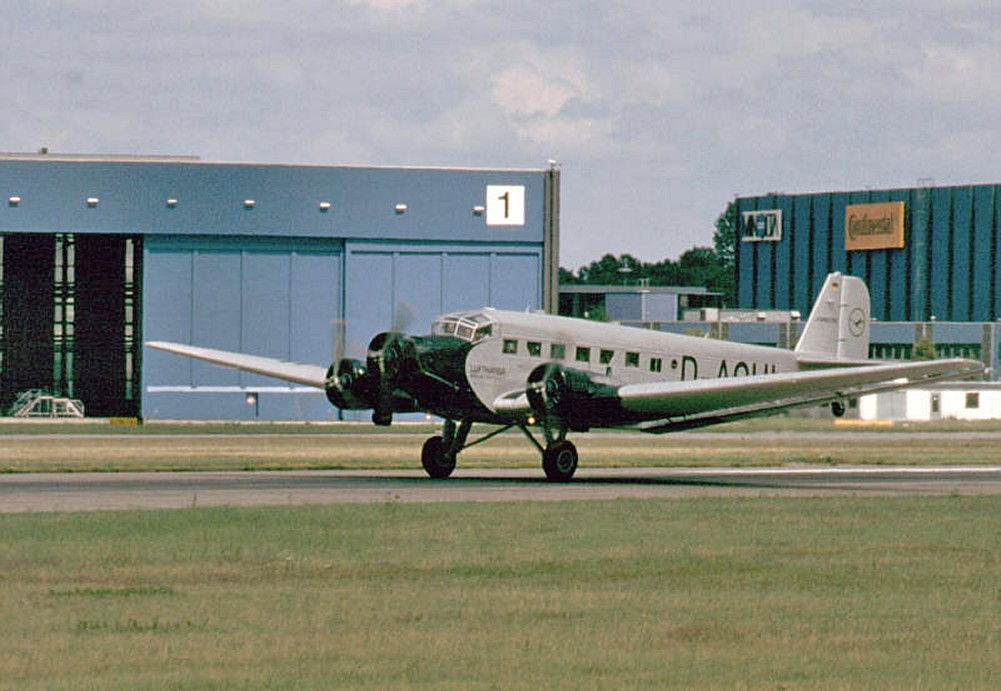
- A JU 52 similar to the accident aircraft

Accident
- Date: 16 November 1937
- Summary: Controlled flight into terrain in poor weather
- Site: Ostend, Belgium; 51°12′3.42″N 2°53′31.42″E

Aircraft
- Aircraft type: Junkers Ju 52/3m
- Operator: Sabena
- Registration: OO-AUB
- Occupants: 12
- Passengers: 9
- Crew: 3
- Fatalities: 12 (Note: The Hereditary Grand Duchess of Hesse was heavily pregnant when she boarded the aircraft and the body of a baby was found in the wreckage, believed to have been born during the flight.)
- Injuries: 0
- Survivors: 0

On 16 November 1937 a Junkers Ju 52/3m owned by Belgian airline SABENA, operating as a scheduled international passenger flight from Munich, Germany, to London, England, crashed near Ostend, Belgium. The aircraft hit a tall factory chimney, at 2:47 p.m. local time, while attempting to land at Stene aerodrome near Ostend, Belgium. The accident killed prominent members of the Hesse royal family on the way to London for the wedding of Louis, Prince of Hesse and by Rhine.

== Accident ==
The flight from Munich to London was scheduled to stop at Frankfurt, Brussels and Ostend Airport but diverted to Stene Aerodrome due to bad weather. The aircraft hit the chimney of a brick factory and crashed, bursting into flames.

All eleven passengers and crew who boarded the aircraft died. The remains of Grand Duchess Cecilie's newborn son were found among the wreckage; a Belgian official enquiry into the crash concluded that she had given birth during the flight and that the birth was the reason the pilot was attempting to land despite the poor weather conditions.

== Crew and passengers ==
Crew:

- Antoine Lambotte, pilot
- Philippe Courtois, wireless operator
- Yvan Lansmans, mechanic

Passengers:

- Georg Donatus, Hereditary Grand Duke of Hesse
- Cecilie, Hereditary Grand Duchess of Hesse, who was 8-months pregnant
- Prince Ludwig of Hesse (Note: also known as Prince Louis)
- Prince Alexander of Hesse
- Eleonore, Grand Duchess of Hesse
- Joachim Riedesel zu Eisenbach, friend of the grand ducal family
- Arthur Martens, world-record setting glider pilot and friend of the grand ducal family
- Sister Lina Hahn, governess of the grand ducal family

== Aircraft ==
The aircraft was a three-engined Junkers Ju 52/3m airliner operated by SABENA and registered in Belgium as OO-AUB.

== Aftermath ==
The wedding of Prince Louis with Margaret Campbell Geddes, daughter of Sir Auckland Geddes was brought forward to the morning after the accident. Baron Riedesel would have been Louis' best man; their friend Oliver Chesterton stood in as best man; the ceremony was small and solemn with the guests in mourning clothes.

Immediately following the wedding, Prince Louis and his wife Margaret travelled to Belgium and visited a hospital where the victims' bodies had been laid out.

The Hereditary Grand Duke and Duchess' fourteen-month-old daughter, Johanna, was the only one of the family who was not on board the aircraft. She was adopted by her uncle Louis in early 1938. Johanna died of meningitis in 1939.

With the death of the childless Prince Louis in 1968, the male line of the Hesse and by Rhine became extinct.

The crash and its effect on Cecilie's younger brother, Philip, were featured in season 2 of the Netflix series, The Crown. However, this fictionalised version wrongly implied that Philip was to blame for Cecilie taking the flight, whereas in reality "her decision to travel to London had nothing to do with Philip". Philip threatened to sue The Crown due to this distortion of history.

== See also ==
- Aviation safety
- List of accidents and incidents involving commercial aircraft

== Bibliography ==
- Duff, David. Hessian Tapestry. David & Charles PLC, 1979.
- Deglas, Christian (2005). Rampen in België : Heizeldrama, gasexplosie in Gellingen, Switelbrand, Herald of Free Enterprise, brand in de Innovation, mijnramp in Marcinelle ... en alle andere drama's die ons land schokten (in Dutch). Tielt: Lannoo. pp. 38–40. ISBN 90-209-6216-7.
