= Princess Eleonore of Solms-Hohensolms-Lich =

Grand Duchess consort of Hesse and by Rhine (1871–1937)

Eleonore of Solms-Hohensolms-Lich
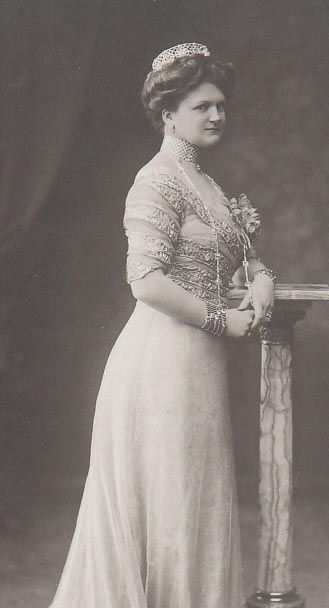
- Grand Duchess Eleonore in 1905

Grand Duchess consort of Hesse and by Rhine
- Tenure: 2 February 1905 – 9 November 1918
- Born: 17 September 1871; Lich, Grand Duchy of Hesse, German Empire
- Died: 16 November 1937 (aged 66); Steene near Ostend, Belgium
- Cause of death: Ostend air crash
- Burial: New Mausoleum, Rosenhöhe Park in Darmstadt
- Spouse: Ernest Louis, Grand Duke of Hesse and by Rhine (m. 1905; died 1937)
- Issue: Georg Donatus, Hereditary Grand Duke of Hesse and by Rhine; Louis, Prince of Hesse and by Rhine
Names
- Eleonore Ernestine Marie
- House: Solms-Hohensolms-Lich
- Father: Hermann, Prince of Solms-Hohensolms-Lich
- Mother: Countess Agnes of Stolberg-Wernigerode

Eleonore of Solms-Hohensolms-Lich (Eleonore Ernestine Marie; 17 September 1871 – 16 November 1937) was Grand Duchess of Hesse and by Rhine as the second wife of Grand Duke Ernest Louis. She was nicknamed "Onor" by her family. She was Regent of Hesse in the absence of her spouse during World War I.

== Biography ==
=== Family ===
Royal Monogram of Princess Eleonore of Solms-Hohensolms-Lich

Eleonore was the fourth child and second daughter of Hermann, Prince of Solms-Hohensolms-Lich and his wife, Countess Agnes of Stolberg-Wernigerode (1842-1904).

=== Grand Duchess of Hesse ===
Eleonore married Ernest Louis, Grand Duke of Hesse in Darmstadt on 2 February 1905. By marriage, she became Grand Duchess of Hesse and by Rhine. As Grand Duchess, she took over the sponsorship and the leadership of a number of charitable organizations previously managed by her mother-in-law.

When her spouse left to join the First World War in 1914, she was appointed to serve the affairs of state as regent in his absence. Eleonore was regarded as a competent regent, and she equipped a hospital train to the front.

When the Hessian Grand Dukedom was abolished in 1918, Eleonore continued to manage her charitable programs after the introduction of democracy.

=== Death ===
Eleonore died in an airplane crash on her way to her son Louis' wedding in London. Also killed in the crash was her elder son Georg Donatus, Hereditary Grand Duke of Hesse, his wife Princess Cecilie of Greece and Denmark, and their two sons, Ludwig and Alexander. The remains of their stillborn son was also found in the wreckage. She is buried alongside members of her family in the New Mausoleum Rosenhöhe, Darmstadt.

== Orders and decorations ==
- Kingdom of Prussia: Lifesaving Medal on Band, 20 April 1898
- Grand Duchy of Hesse:
  - Dame of the Order of the Golden Lion, in Diamonds, 2 February 1905
  - Grand Cross of the Ludwig Order, in Diamonds, 2 February 1905

== Issue ==
Eleonore and Ernest Louis had two sons:

- Georg Donatus, Hereditary Grand Duke of Hesse and by Rhine (1906–1937), who married Princess Cecilie of Greece and Denmark (sister of Prince Philip, Duke of Edinburgh), and had issue.
- Louis, Prince of Hesse and by Rhine (1908–1968). Married Hon. Margaret Campbell Geddes, daughter of Lord Geddes, no issue. He adopted Moritz, Landgrave of Hesse as heir.

== Ancestry ==
Ancestors of Princess Eleonore of Solms-Hohensolms-Lich

8. Karl Ludwig, Prince of Solms-Hohensolms-Lich
4. Ferdinand, Prince of Solms-Hohensolms-Lich
9. Princess Henriette of Bentheim and Steinfurt
2. Hermann, Prince of Solms-Hohensolms-Lich
10. Anton Octavian, Prince of Collalto and San Salvatore
5. Countess Caroline of Collalto and San Salvatore
11. Countess Karolina Apponyi de Nagyappony
1. Eleonore, Grand Duchess of Hesse and by Rhine
12. Konstantin, Count of Stolberg-Wernigerode
6. William, Count of Stolberg-Wernigerode
13. Baroness Ernestine von der Recke
3. Countess Agnes of Stolberg-Wernigerode
14. August, Count of Stolberg-Roßla
7. Countess Elisabeth of Stolberg-Roßla
15. Countess Caroline of Erbach-Schönberg

== Notes ==
Princess Eleonore of Solms-Hohensolms-Lich House of Solms-Hohensolms-Lich Cadet branch of the House of Solms Born: 17 September 1871 Died: 16 November 1937
German royalty
Vacant Title last held by Victoria Melita of Saxe-Coburg and Gotha	Grand Duchess of Hesse and by Rhine; 2 February 1905 – 9 November 1918	None; Grand Duchy abolished in 1918
Titles in pretence
None	— TITULAR — Grand Duchess of Hesse and by Rhine; 9 November 1918 – 9 October 1937; Reason for succession failure: Grand Duchy abolished in 1918	Succeeded by Cecilie of Greece and Denmark
