= Louis, Prince of Hesse and by Rhine =

Prince of Hesse and by Rhine (1908–1968)

Ludwig
- Prince of Hesse and by Rhine
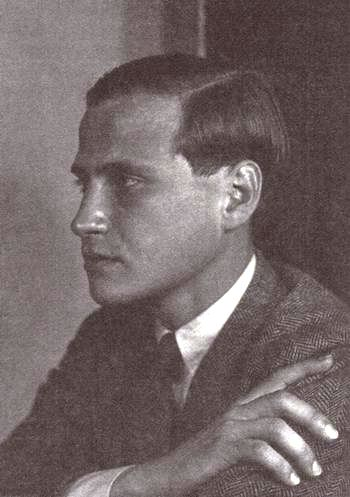
- Louis in the 1920s

Head of the House of Hesse-Darmstadt
- Tenure: 16 November 1937 – 30 May 1968
- Predecessor: Georg Donatus, Hereditary Grand Duke of Hesse
- Successor: Philip, Landgrave of Hesse (as Head of the House of Hesse)
- Born: 20 November 1908; Darmstadt, German Empire
- Died: 30 May 1968 (aged 59); Frankfurt, West Germany
- Burial: 6 June 1968; Neues Mausoleum, Park Rosenhöhe, Darmstadt, Hesse, Germany
- Spouse: Margaret Campbell Geddes (m. 1937)
Names
- Ludwig Hermann Alexander Chlodwig
- House: Hesse-Darmstadt
- Father: Ernest Louis, Grand Duke of Hesse
- Mother: Princess Eleonore of Solms-Hohensolms-Lich

Louis, Prince of Hesse and by Rhine (Ludwig Hermann Alexander Chlodwig, 20 November 1908 – 30 May 1968) was the youngest son of Ernest Louis, Grand Duke of Hesse by his second wife, Princess Eleonore of Solms-Hohensolms-Lich. He was a great-grandson of Queen Victoria.

== Life ==
After studying archeology and art history, Louis was appointed as an attaché at the German Embassy in London.

In her book Noble Endeavours, Miranda Seymour describes the circumstances of how and when Louis first met Margaret Campbell Geddes, daughter of Sir Auckland Campbell Geddes, later created first Baron Geddes and the development of the relationship.

"Margaret Geddes, a young Scotswoman who was known to one and all as 'Peg', travelled out to Germany towards the end of 1935 in order to join two beloved brothers at a pension [in Grainau ] in Bavaria. Unknown to Peg, a little advance plotting had been going on. Waiting to meet her at the local station in the place of her brothers and all ready to conduct her to Haus Hirth was a dark-haired and extremely good-looking young German. His name was Ludwig ('Lu') and he was the music-loving second son of Grand Duke Ernst of Hessen-Darmstadt [the last Grand Duke of Hesse]…

"While Peg’s younger brother, David, went off on cultural trips around the Bavarian towns…, Peg spent most of her time with Lu. The result, as Prince Ludwig came from a family who had always used English as their preferred language, was that Peg's German grammar progressed less well than did her romance with a kind, sensitive and humorous young man.[endnote]"

They were married on 17 November 1937 at St Peter's Church, Eaton Square, dressed in mourning, as on the previous day Louis's older brother Georg Donatus, the last Hereditary Grand Duke of Hesse, his mother Grand Duchess Eleonore, his sister-in-law, and his nephews, were all killed in the Sabena OO-AUB Ostend crash, on their way to the wedding. The couple swiftly travelled to Darmstadt for the funerals.

As a result of his brother's death in the Sabena air crash, Louis succeeded him as head of the formerly grand-ducal House of Hesse-Darmstadt.

The couple had no children. Soon after the death of Georg Donatus and his wife, Louis adopted his one-year-old niece Princess Johanna, who was left as the nominal heiress of the Grand-Ducal House of Hesse and by Rhine, but the little girl died of meningitis in 1939.

During the Second World War, Louis was drafted into military service. Soon after, however, he was eliminated from the Wehrmacht along with other members of formerly ruling houses, because of "political unreliability" according to the Prinzenerlass, although he had joined the Nazi Party as a precaution to protect his position and property. He then withdrew to his estate Schloss Wolfsgarten near Frankfurt with his wife, who aroused suspicion because of her British origins. They made Wolfsgarten available as a military hospital of the German Red Cross during the Second World War. Louis and his wife adopted and took care of the younger children of Philipp, Landgrave of Hesse, after the latter had been arrested first by the Nazis and then by U.S. forces, while his wife Princess Mafalda of Savoy had died in the Buchenwald concentration camp after it was bombed by the Allies.

After the end of the war, the couple helped with the reconstruction of Darmstadt, in art, museums, and charitable institutions such as the Alice Hospital, the Eleonora Home, and the German Red Cross, of which Margaret was a board member for two decades from 1958.

Louis's sister-in-law Cecilie of Hesse, Princess of Greece and Denmark who had died in the Sabena plane crash, was a sister of the future Prince Philip, Duke of Edinburgh. As a result, a close friendship developed between the Hessian royal couple and Elizabeth II and her husband Philip. They are credited with helping the British royal family to reestablish connections with their German relations after the Second World War. The royal couple paid a visit to Louis (called Lu) and Margaret (called Peg) at their home in Wolfsgarten on 20 May 1965.

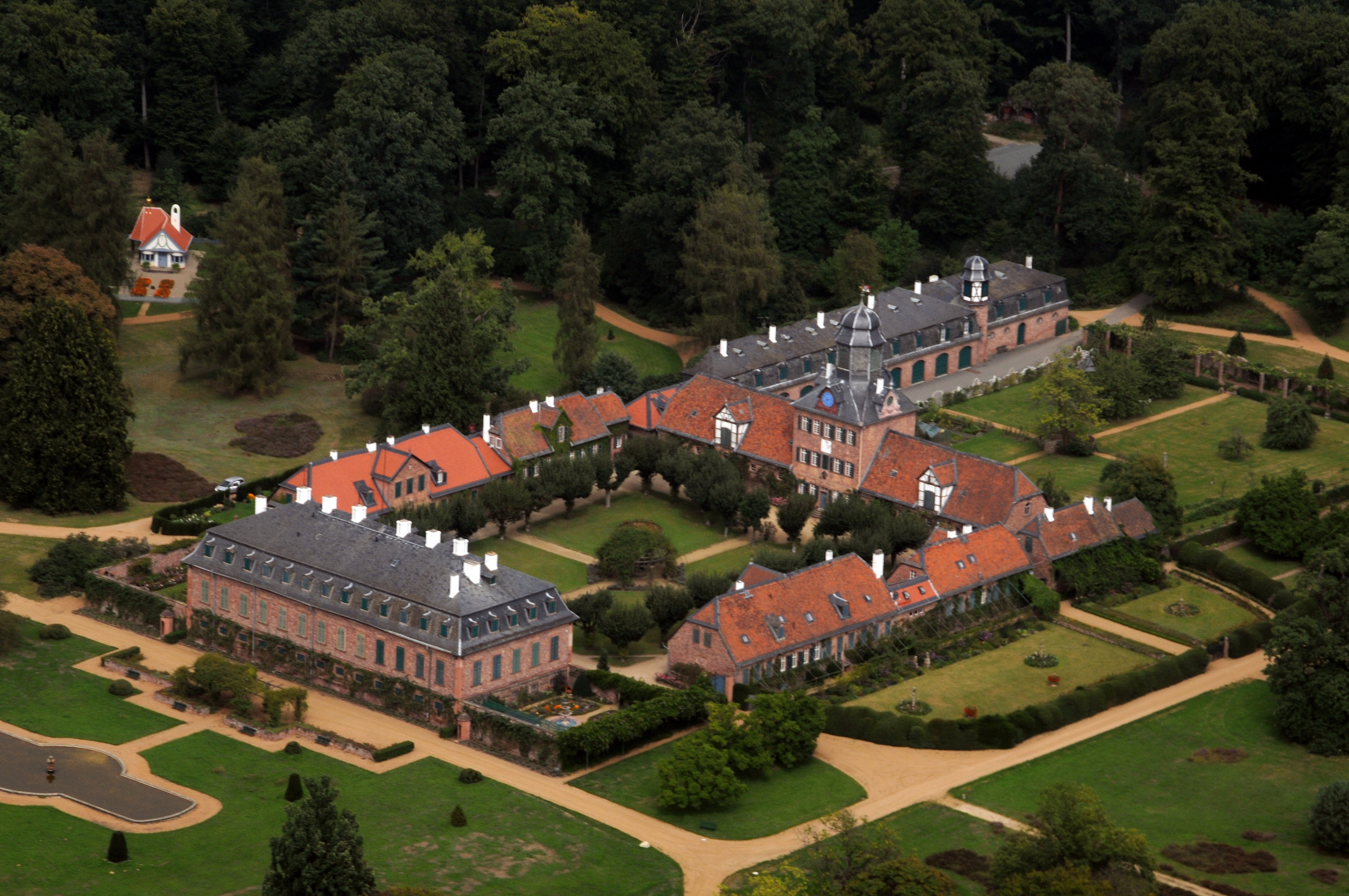
Schloss Wolfsgarten

As a lover of classical music, Louis promoted the Ansbach Bach Festival and the Aldeburgh Festival. He translated texts for his friend Benjamin Britten (1913–76) and had the English composer come to Wolfsgarten, where parts of his opera Death in Venice, published in 1973, were written. He introduced Britten to the poetry of Friedrich Hölderlin (1770–1843), and Britten dedicated his song cycle Sechs Hölderlin-Fragmente (1958) to Prince Louis.

In 1964, he stood as godfather to Prince Edward. In 1960, Prince Louis adopted his distant cousin, Moritz, Landgrave of Hesse. With the death of Prince Louis in Frankfurt in 1968, he was succeeded by Moritz's father, Philipp, Landgrave of Hesse (died 1980) as head of the house. Moritz (died 2013) in turn was succeeded by his son, Donatus (born 1966).

== Ancestry ==
Ancestors of Louis, Prince of Hesse and by Rhine

16. Louis II, Grand Duke of Hesse
8. Prince Karl of Hesse and by Rhine
17. Princess Wilhelmine of Baden
4. Louis IV, Grand Duke of Hesse
18. Prince Wilhelm of Prussia
9. Princess Elizabeth of Prussia
19. Landgravine Marie Anna of Hesse-Homburg
2. Ernest Louis, Grand Duke of Hesse
20. Ernest I, Duke of Saxe-Coburg and Gotha
10. Prince Albert of Saxe-Coburg and Gotha
21. Princess Louise of Saxe-Gotha-Altenburg
5. Alice of the United Kingdom
22. Prince Edward, Duke of Kent and Strathearn
11. Victoria of the United Kingdom
23. Princess Victoria of Saxe-Coburg-Saalfeld
1. Louis, Prince of Hesse and by Rhine
24. Karl Ludwig, Prince of Solms-Hohensolms-Lich
12. Ferdinand, Prince of Solms-Hohensolms-Lich
25. Princess Henriette of Bentheim and Steinfurt
6. Hermann, Prince of Solms-Hohensolms-Lich
26. Anton Octavian, Prince of Collalto and San Salvatore
13. Countess Caroline of Collalto and San Salvatore
27. Countess Karolina Apponyi de Nagyappony
3. Princess Eleonore of Solms-Hohensolms-Lich
28. Konstantin, Count of Stolberg-Wernigerode
14. Wilhelm, Count of Stolberg-Wernigerode
29. Baroness Ernestine von der Reck
7. Countess Agnes of Stolberg-Wernigerode
30. August, Count of Stolberg-Roßla
15. Countess Elisabeth of Stolberg-Roßla
31. Countess Caroline of Erbach-Schönberg

Louis, Prince of Hesse and by Rhine House of Hesse-Darmstadt Born: 20 November 1908 Died: 30 May 1968
Titles in pretence
Preceded by Georg Donatus	— TITULAR — Grand Duke of Hesse and by Rhine; 1937–1968; Reason for succession failure: Grand Duchy abolished in 1918	Succeeded by Philipp
