= Georg Donatus, Hereditary Grand Duke of Hesse =

Hereditary Grand Duke of Hesse and by Rhine (1906–1937)

Georg Donatus
- Hereditary Grand Duke of Hesse (by Rhine)
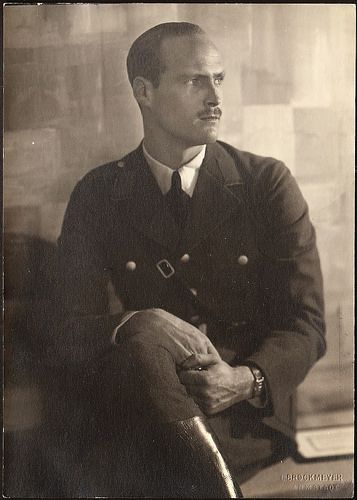
- Georg Donatus in 1934

Head of the House of Hesse-Darmstadt
- Tenure: 9 October 1937 – 16 November 1937
- Predecessor: Grand Duke Ernest Louis I
- Successor: Prince Louis
- Born: 8 November 1906; Darmstadt, Grand Duchy of Hesse, German Empire
- Died: 16 November 1937 (aged 31); Ostend, Belgium
- Cause of death: Ostend air crash
- Burial: 23 November 1937; New Mausoleum, Rosenhöhe Park, Darmstadt
- Spouse: Princess Cecilie of Greece and Denmark (m. 1931)
- Issue: Prince Ludwig; Prince Alexander; Princess Johanna; Unnamed son
Names
- German: Georg Donatus Wilhelm Nikolaus Eduard Heinrich Karl; English: George Donatus William Nicholas Edward Henry Charles
- House: Hesse-Darmstadt
- Father: Ernest Louis, Grand Duke of Hesse and by Rhine
- Mother: Princess Eleonore of Solms-Hohensolms-Lich

Georg Donatus, Hereditary Grand Duke of Hesse (Georg Donatus Wilhelm Nikolaus Eduard Heinrich Karl, 8 November 1906 – 16 November 1937), was the first child of Ernest Louis, Grand Duke of Hesse, and his second wife, Princess Eleonore of Solms-Hohensolms-Lich. He was a nephew of Empress Alexandra and Emperor Nicholas II of Russia, and a great-grandson of Queen Victoria of the United Kingdom.

== Marriage and children ==
On 2 February 1931, in Darmstadt, Georg Donatus, a great-grandson of Queen Victoria, married his first cousin once removed, Princess Cecilie of Greece and Denmark, daughter of Prince Andrew of Greece and Denmark and Princess Alice of Battenberg, sister of Prince Philip, Duke of Edinburgh, and great-great-granddaughter of Queen Victoria and Prince Albert. The couple had four children:

- Prince Ludwig Ernst Andreas of Hesse and by Rhine (25 October 1931 – 16 November 1937), killed in the air accident.
- Prince Alexander Georg Karl Heinrich of Hesse and by Rhine (14 April 1933 – 16 November 1937), killed in the air accident.
- Princess Johanna Marina Eleonore of Hesse and by Rhine (20 September 1936 – 14 June 1939), died from meningitis.
- Unnamed son (16 November 1937), apparently born just before the air accident.

On 1 May 1937, Georg Donatus and Cecilie both joined the Nazi Party.

== Death ==
In October 1937, Georg Donatus's father, Grand Duke Ernest Louis of Hesse, died.

A few weeks after the funeral, his younger brother, Prince Louis, was due to marry the Hon. Margaret Geddes, daughter of Lord Geddes. On 16 November 1937, Georg Donatus, Cecilie, their two young sons, Georg Donatus's mother, Grand Duchess Eleonore, the children's nurse, a family friend, a pilot, and two crewmen took off in a Sabena Junkers Ju 52 aeroplane from Darmstadt, bound for the United Kingdom, where Louis's marriage ceremony was to take place. The aeroplane struck a factory chimney near Ostend, in Belgium, and crashed, bursting into flames and killing everyone on board. Cecilie was in an advanced state of pregnancy with their fourth child at the time of the crash. The remains of the newborn baby were found in the wreckage, indicating that Cecilie had gone into labour during the flight. The inquiry by the Belgian authorities suggested that, because of the birth, the pilot had attempted to land at the Stene aerodrome in Ostend despite poor weather conditions.

== Aftermath ==
Louis's wedding had been scheduled for the 20 November but, following discussions with his future father-in-law Lord Geddes, was brought forward to the day after the accident (17 November) as a small and quiet ceremony, with the guests dressed in mourning.

Immediately afterwards, he set off with his new wife Margaret, to Belgium to visit the crash site. The funeral and burial of Georg Donatus and his family took place at the Rosenhöhe, Darmstadt, Hesse, a few days later. Among those attending were Prince Philip, Prince Christoph of Hesse, Gottfried, Prince of Hohenlohe-Langenburg, Prince Philipp of Hesse, Berthold, Margrave of Baden, Prince August Wilhelm of Prussia, and Lord Louis Mountbatten. A photograph of the funeral procession, showing Prince Louis as chief mourner, depicts crowds saluting the mourners with the Hitler salute. World War II began less than two years later.

Georg Donatus and Cecilie's 14‑month‑old daughter, Johanna, was the only member of the immediate family who was not on board the aircraft. She was adopted by her uncle Louis and aunt Margaret in early 1938. Johanna died of meningitis in 1939.

With the death of the childless Louis in 1968, the male line of the Hesse and by Rhine became extinct.

== Titles ==
- 8 November 1906 – 16 November 1937: His Royal Highness The Hereditary Grand Duke of Hesse and by Rhine

Georg Donatus never acceded to the grand‑ducal throne, as it had been abolished at the end of the First World War. After that point, former titles were often adopted as surnames, and it became uncommon for the head of a royal, grand‑ducal, or ducal family to change his title upon succeeding as head of the house.

== Ancestry ==
Ancestors of Georg Donatus, Hereditary Grand Duke of Hesse

8. Prince Charles of Hesse and by Rhine
4. Louis IV, Grand Duke of Hesse and by Rhine
9. Princess Elisabeth of Prussia
2. Ernest Louis, Grand Duke of Hesse and by Rhine
10. Prince Albert of Saxe-Coburg and Gotha
5. Princess Alice of the United Kingdom
11. Victoria of the United Kingdom
1. Georg Donatus, Hereditary Grand Duke of Hesse and by Rhine
12. Ferdinand, Prince of Solms-Hohensolms-Lich
6. Hermann, Prince of Solms-Hohensolms-Lich
13. Countess Caroline of Collalto and San Salvatore
3. Princess Eleonore of Solms-Hohensolms-Lich
14. Wilhelm, Count of Stolberg-Wernigerode
7. Countess Agnes of Stolberg-Wernigerode
15. Countess Elisabeth of Stolberg-Roßla

=== Patrilineal descent ===
1. Gilbert I, Count of the Maasgau, d. 842
2. Gilbert II, Count of the Maasgau, 825–875
3. Reginar, Duke of Lorraine, 850–915
4. Reginar II, Count of Hainaut, 890–932
5. Reginar III, Count of Hainaut, 920–973
6. Lambert I, Count of Leuven, 950–1015
7. Lambert II, Count of Leuven, d. 1054
8. Henry II, Count of Leuven, 1020–1078
9. Godfrey I, Count of Leuven, 1060–1139
10. Godfrey II, Count of Leuven, 1187–1226
11. Godfrey III, Count of Leuven, 1140–1190
12. Henry I, Duke of Brabant, 1165–1235
13. Henry II, Duke of Brabant, 1207–1248
14. Henry I, Landgrave of Hesse, 1244–1308
15. Otto I, Landgrave of Hesse, 1272–1328
16. Louis the Junker of Hesse, 1305–1345
17. Hermann II, Landgrave of Hesse, 1341–1413
18. Louis I, Landgrave of Hesse, 1402–1458
19. Louis II, Landgrave of Hesse, 1438–1471
20. William II, Landgrave of Hesse, 1469–1509
21. Philip I, Landgrave of Hesse, 1504–1567
22. George I, Landgrave of Hesse-Darmstadt, 1547–1596
23. Louis V, Landgrave of Hesse-Darmstadt, 1577–1626
24. George II, Landgrave of Hesse-Darmstadt, 1605–1661
25. Louis VI, Landgrave of Hesse-Darmstadt, 1630–1678
26. Ernest Louis, Landgrave of Hesse-Darmstadt, 1667–1739
27. Louis VIII, Landgrave of Hesse-Darmstadt, 1691–1768
28. Louis IX, Landgrave of Hesse-Darmstadt, 1719–1790
29. Louis I, Grand Duke of Hesse, 1753–1830
30. Louis II, Grand Duke of Hesse, 1777–1848
31. Prince Charles of Hesse and by Rhine, 1809–1877
32. Louis IV, Grand Duke of Hesse, 1837–1892
33. Ernest Louis, Grand Duke of Hesse, 1868–1937
34. Georg Donatus, Hereditary Grand Duke of Hesse, 1906–1937

== See also ==
- Sabena OO-AUB Ostend crash
- Former German nobility in the Nazi Party

Georg Donatus, Hereditary Grand Duke of Hesse House of Hesse-Darmstadt Cadet branch of the House of Hesse Born: 8 November 1906 Died: 16 November 1937
German royalty
Preceded by Grand Duke Ernest Louis I	Head of the House of Hesse-Darmstadt; 9 October 1937 – 16 November 1937	Succeeded by Prince Louis
Titles in pretence
Preceded by Grand Duke Ernest Louis I	— TITULAR — Grand Duke of Hesse and by Rhine; 9 October 1937 – 16 November 1937; Reason for succession failure: Grand Dukedom abolished in 1918	Succeeded by Grand Duke Louis V
