= Schloß Wolfsgarten =

Hunting lodge in Hesse, Germany

Coordinates: 49°58′49.0″N 8°38′21.4″E

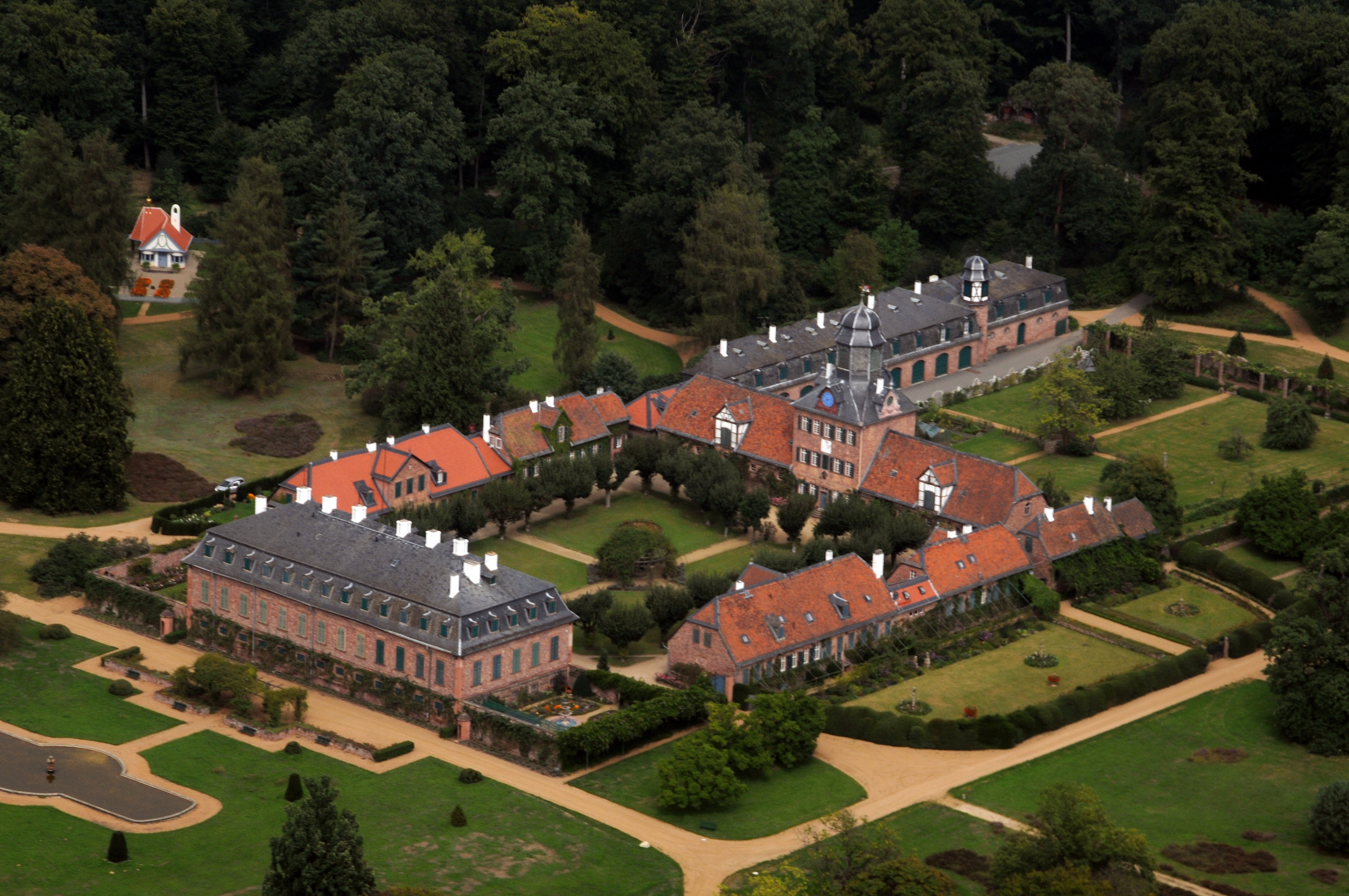
Schloss Wolfsgarten seen from the air (2008)

Schloss Wolfsgarten is a former hunting lodge in located near Langen in Hesse, Germany, approximately 15 kilometers south of Frankfurt am Main. Originally constructed in 1722 by order of Landgrave Ernst Ludwig of Hesse-Darmstadt, the estate served as a hunting retreat for the ruling family of Hesse-Darmstadt. Over time, Schloss Wolfsgarten evolved into a secondary residence and country seat for members of the Grand Ducal family. Today, it remains under the ownership of the House of Hesse and is occasionally used for private events and family gatherings. The surrounding gardens, noted for their extensive rhododendron displays, are seasonally open to the public and are a popular destination for visitors interested in horticulture and regional history.

== History ==
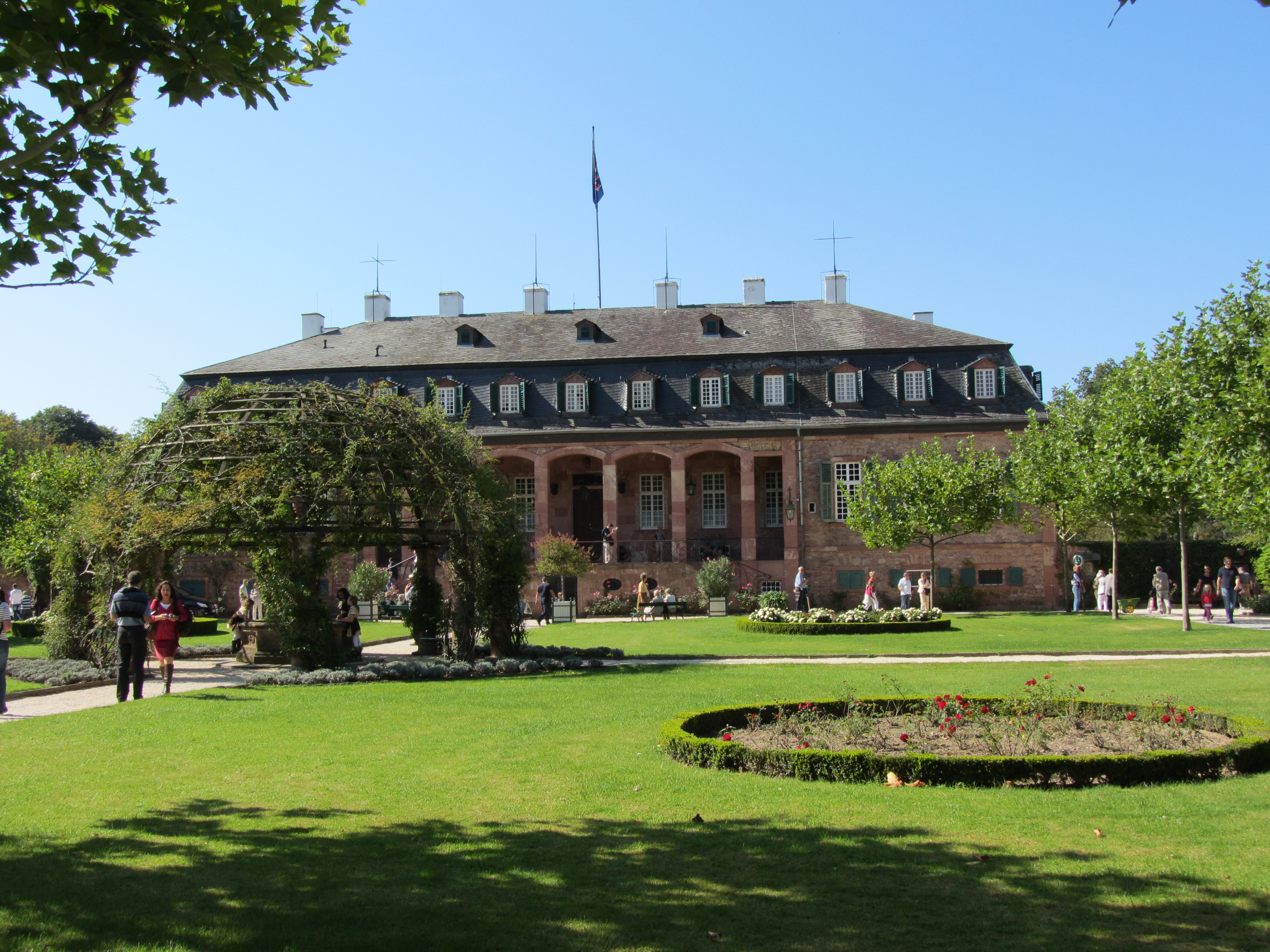
Main building of the Schloss Wolfsgarten complex (2012)

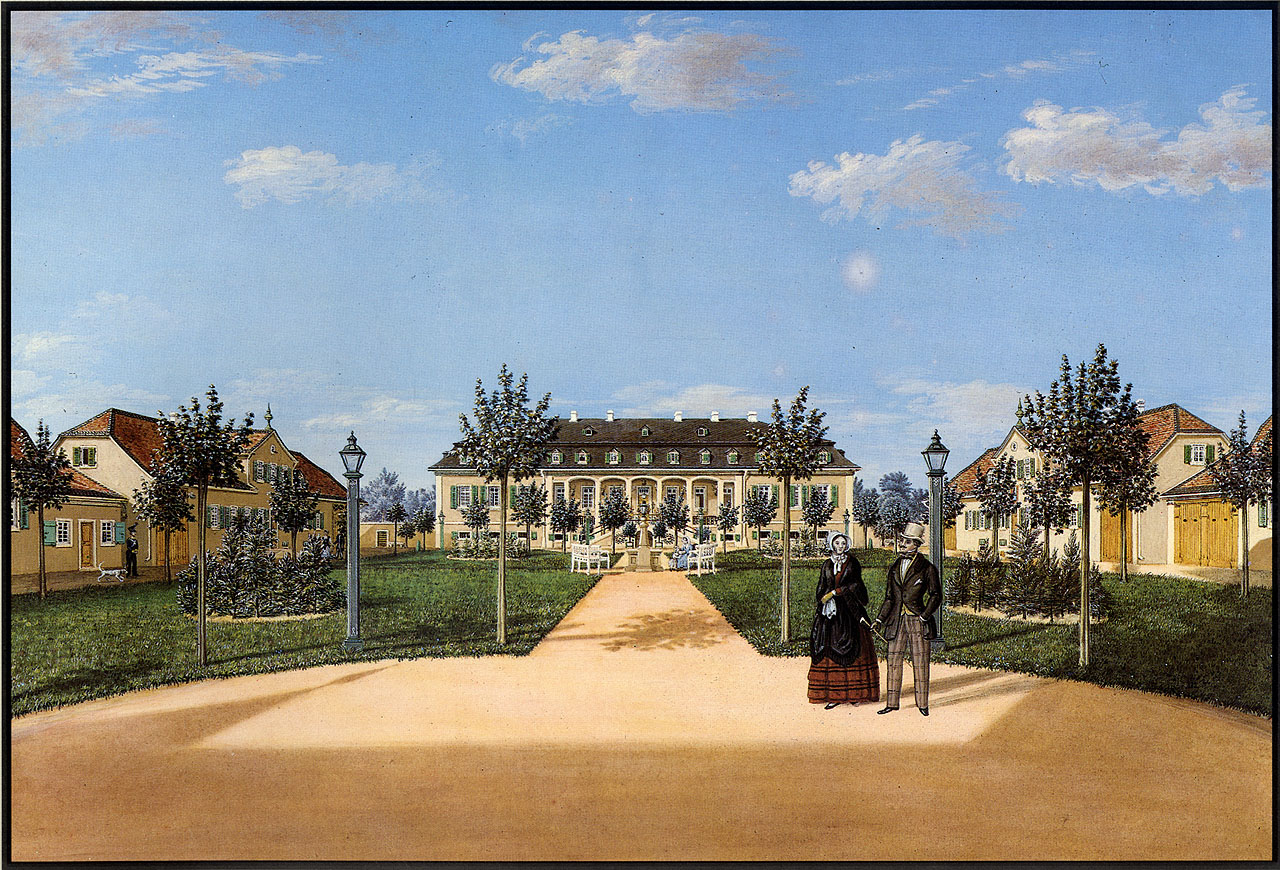
Schloss Wolfsgarten by Ernst August Schnittspahn (1848)

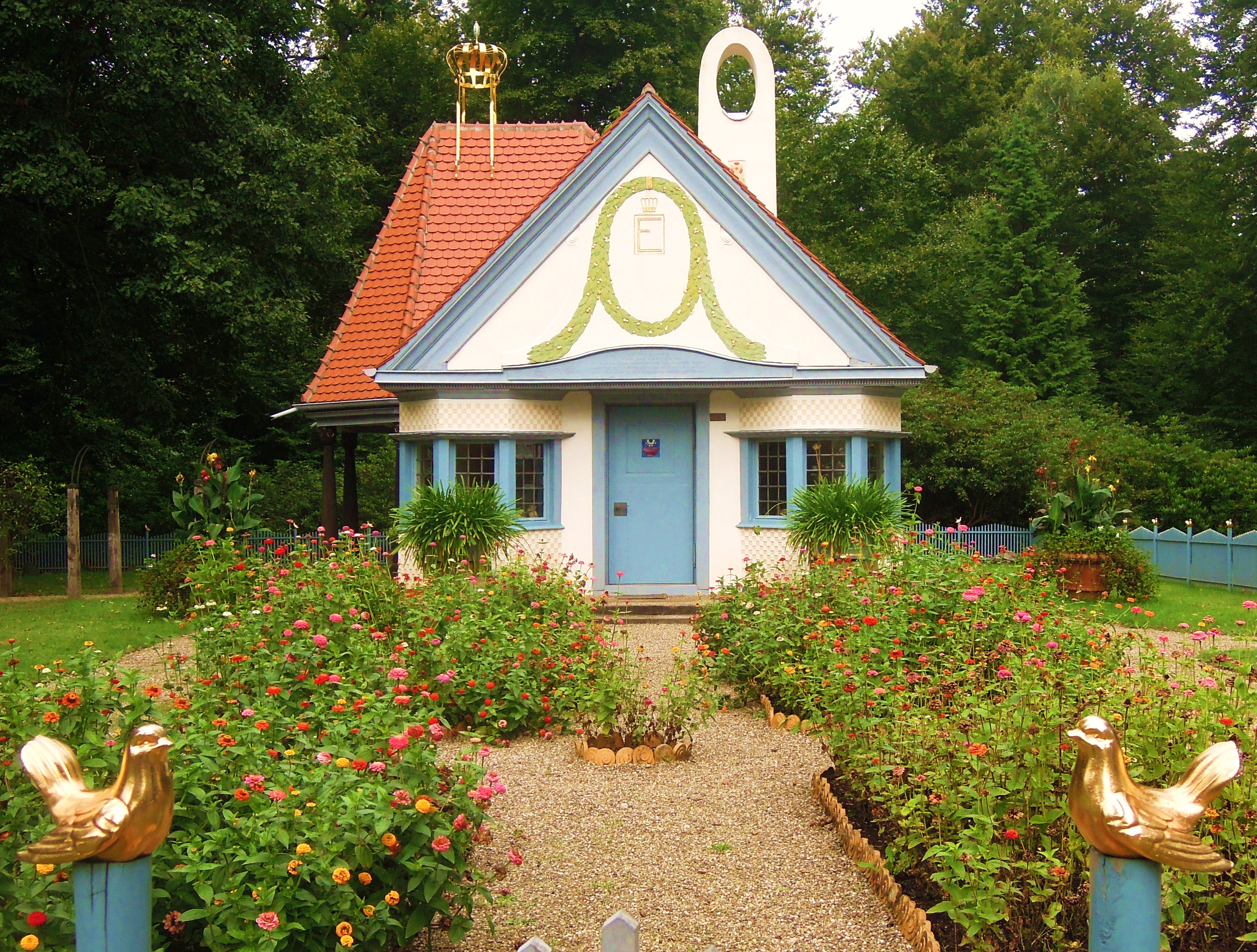
Princess Elisabeth’s playhouse her father, Grand Duke Ernst, had built for her in the garden (2013)

=== 18th century ===
The hunting lodge was established between 1722 and 1724 by Landgrave Ernst Ludwig of Hesse-Darmstadt. Ernst Ludwig's purpose in establishing Wolfsgarten was to pursue his passion for hunting, especially the par force hunts. The original building corresponded to the usual pattern for hunting seats of that era with a rectangular yard around which was grouped housing for gentlemen, the stables for the horses, and kennels for the dogs.

‘Par force’ hunts were grand theatrical events, meticulously planned to demonstrate power and greatness. Ernst Ludwig and his guests participated in the hunt, or positioned themselves centrally in the forest while they waited to be summoned. Meanwhile, the mounted hunters and their hounds pursued the day's quarry. From their waiting place, the Landgrave and his guests could watch the hunters, horses and hounds as they persecuted the frantic stag at great speed. When the exhausted stag was no longer able to run, the dogs held it fast by biting its throat, ears, legs and muzzle. Thus, the stag was “fixed” and the Landgrave was summoned with a special horn signal. He carried out his duty as the master of the hunt by killing the stag with a stab wound to the heart.

=== Revival under Grand Dukes Ludwig IV and Ernst Ludwig ===
After Ernst Ludwig's successors abandoned hunting with dogs in 1768, Wolfsgarten was abandoned until the 1830s when the grand ducal family began to restore and expand the property. From 1879, Wolfsgarten became a favorite country retreat for Grand Dukes Ludwig IV and his son Ernst Ludwig.

At the start of the 20th century, the lodge underwent extensive renovations, and the park was rearranged. Among the additions was the Princess’s House (also known as the "Playhouse"), built in 1902 in the Jugendstil style by architect Joseph Maria Olbrich for Princess Elisabeth, daughter of Grand Duke Ernst Ludwig. The house and all of its furnishings were scaled down to suit the size of the then seven-year-old princess. Today, it remains the only surviving work by Joseph Maria Olbrich that has been preserved in its original, unaltered condition.

In November 1903, Tsar Nicholas II visited Grand Duke Ernst Ludwig—who was divorced and not yet remarried—at Schloss Wolfsgarten. Ernst Ludwig’s sister, Alix of Hesse, had become the Tsar’s wife in November 1894, taking the name Alexandra and becoming the last Empress of Russia. Following a meeting in Wiesbaden, the Tsar and Emperor Wilhelm II met at Wolfsgarten on 5 November. Wilhelm II attempted to persuade the Tsar, his cousin, to enter into a “Holy Alliance” between Russia, Germany, and Austria. Later that same month, Ernst Ludwig and his eight-year-old daughter accepted an invitation from his sister and her husband for a family visit to the hunting lodge at Skierniewice, where Princess Elisabeth died on 16 November 1903, after a brief illness.

=== From 1918 until Today ===
After the abolition of the monarchy in 1918, Wolfsgarten became the principal residence of the former grand ducal family. It served as home to Louis, Prince of Hesse and by Rhine until his death in 1968 and then to his widow, Princess Margaret, née Geddes (1913–1997), a close friend of Queen Elizabeth II. Following her death it was occupied by Moritz, Landgrave of Hesse and since 2013 by his eldest son, Donatus, Landgrave of Hesse.

In September 2013, the side buildings of the hunting lodge were restored to their 1844 condition, based on a painting by Ernst August Schnittspahn. The rubble stone walls were plastered in beige to protect the fragile masonry from the elements. Additionally, the roofs—covering an area of 3,000 square meters—were re-shingled, and their wooden supporting structures were renewed. Similar restoration measures are planned for the main residence and the stables at a later date.

Schloss Wolfsgarten is the property of the Hessian House Foundation (Hessische Hausstiftung), the family trust that holds ownership to the property belonging to all branches of the House of Hesse. The property is open to the public only on two weekends in May during the annual Rhododendrenblüte (Rhododendron festival) and again for a weekend in September for the Schloss Wolfsgarten Garden Festival.

== Gallery: Views of Schloss Wolfsgarten by Johann Jakob Hill ==
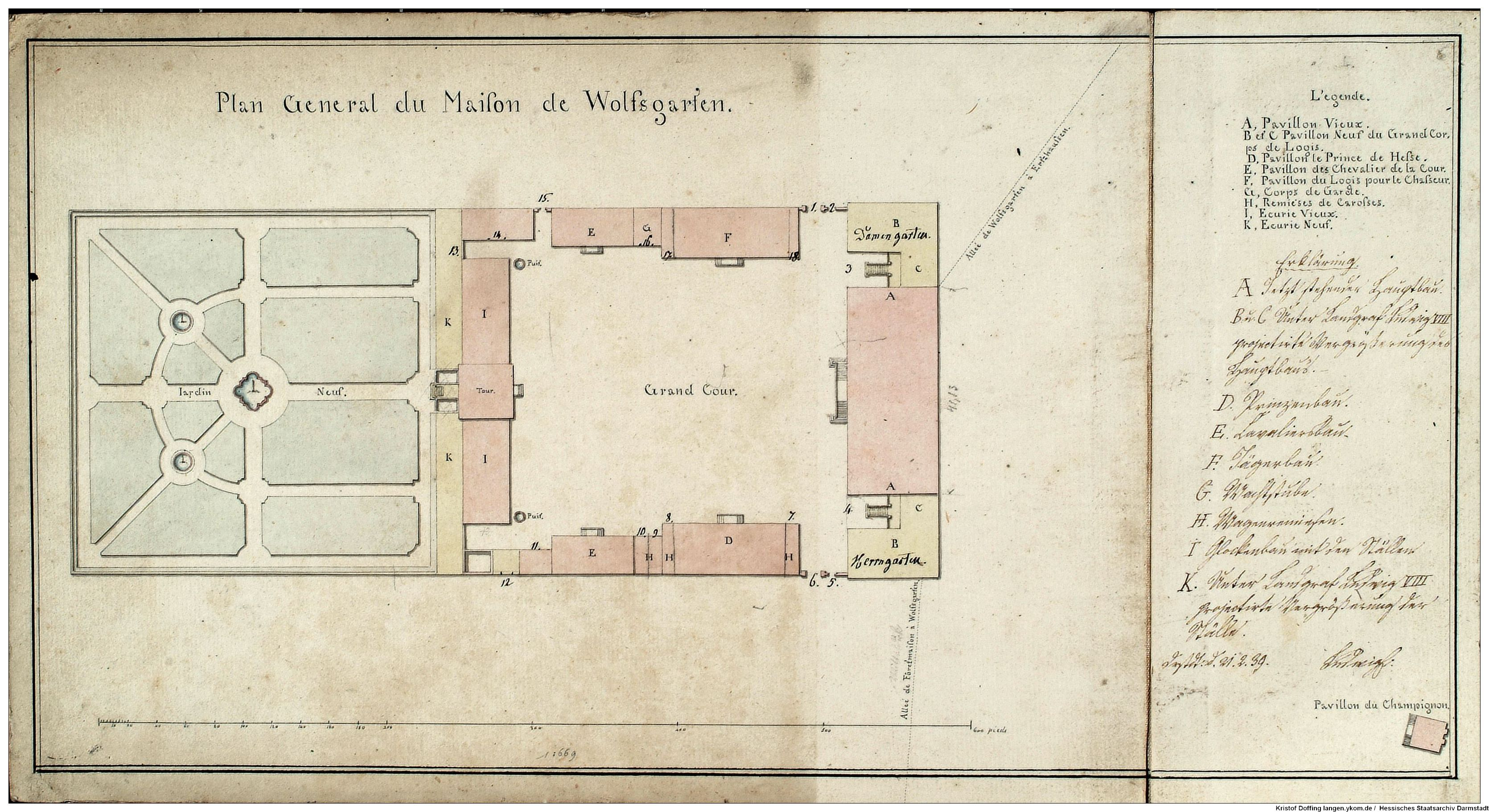
Plan of Schloss wolfsgarten

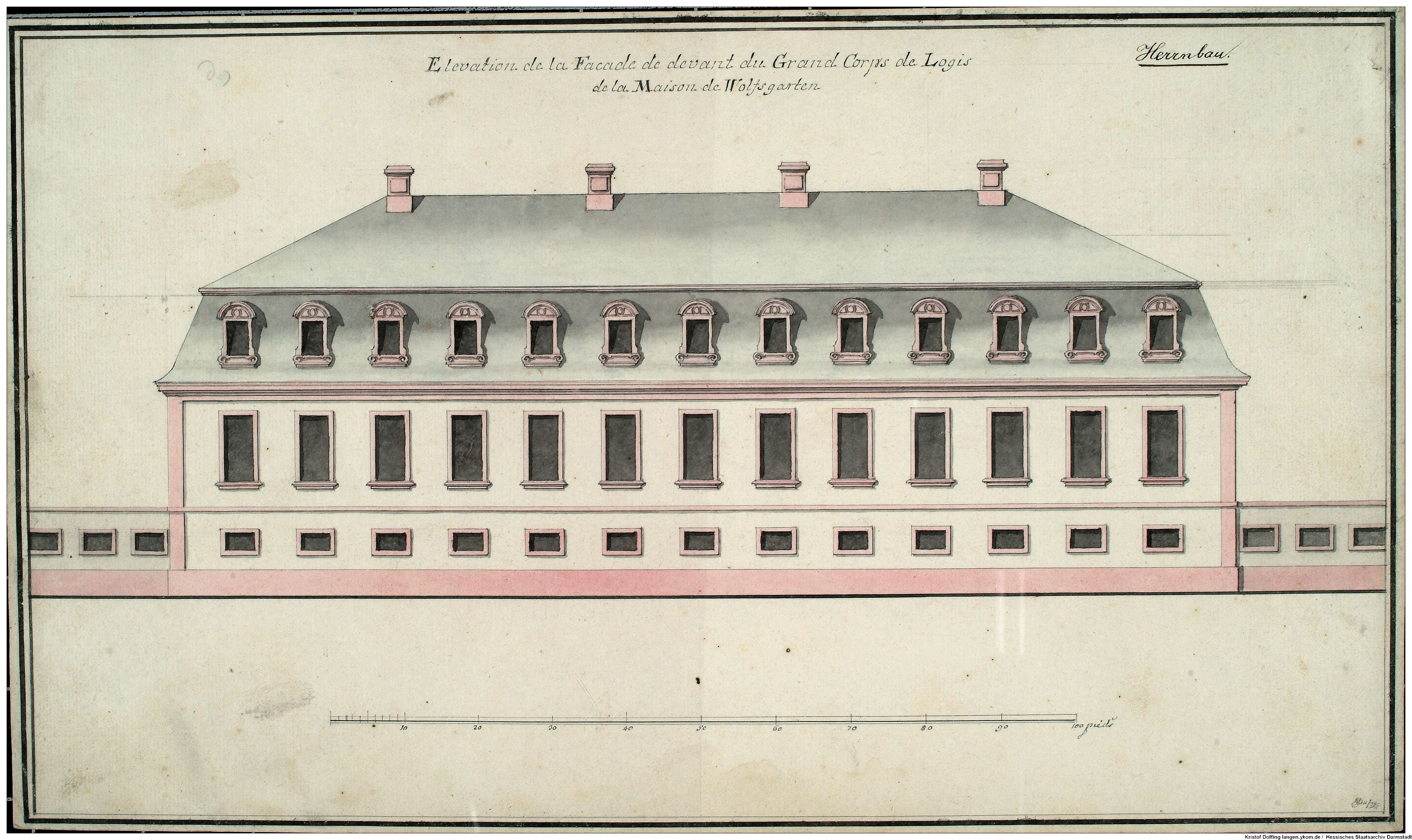
Main building

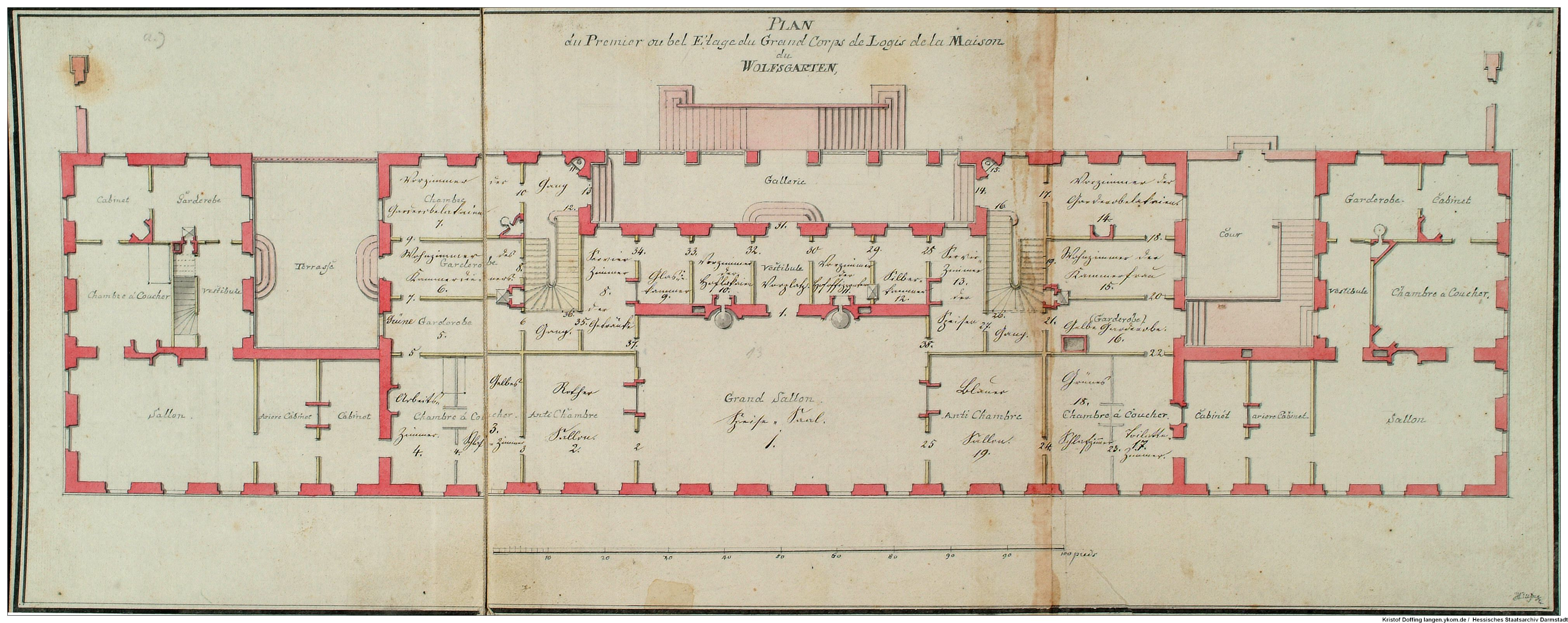
Floor plan of the main building with potential extensions

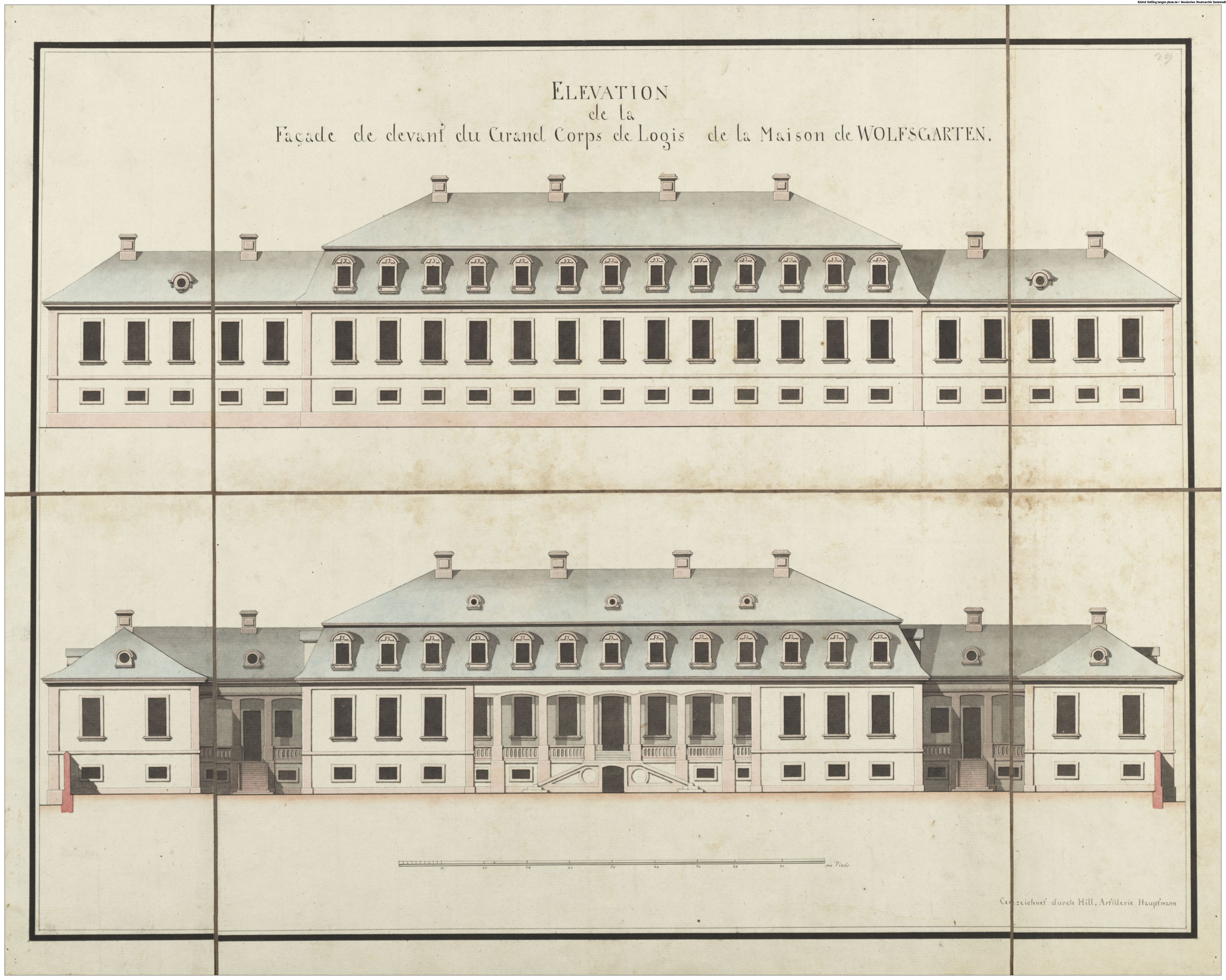
Proposal to rebuild and extend the main building

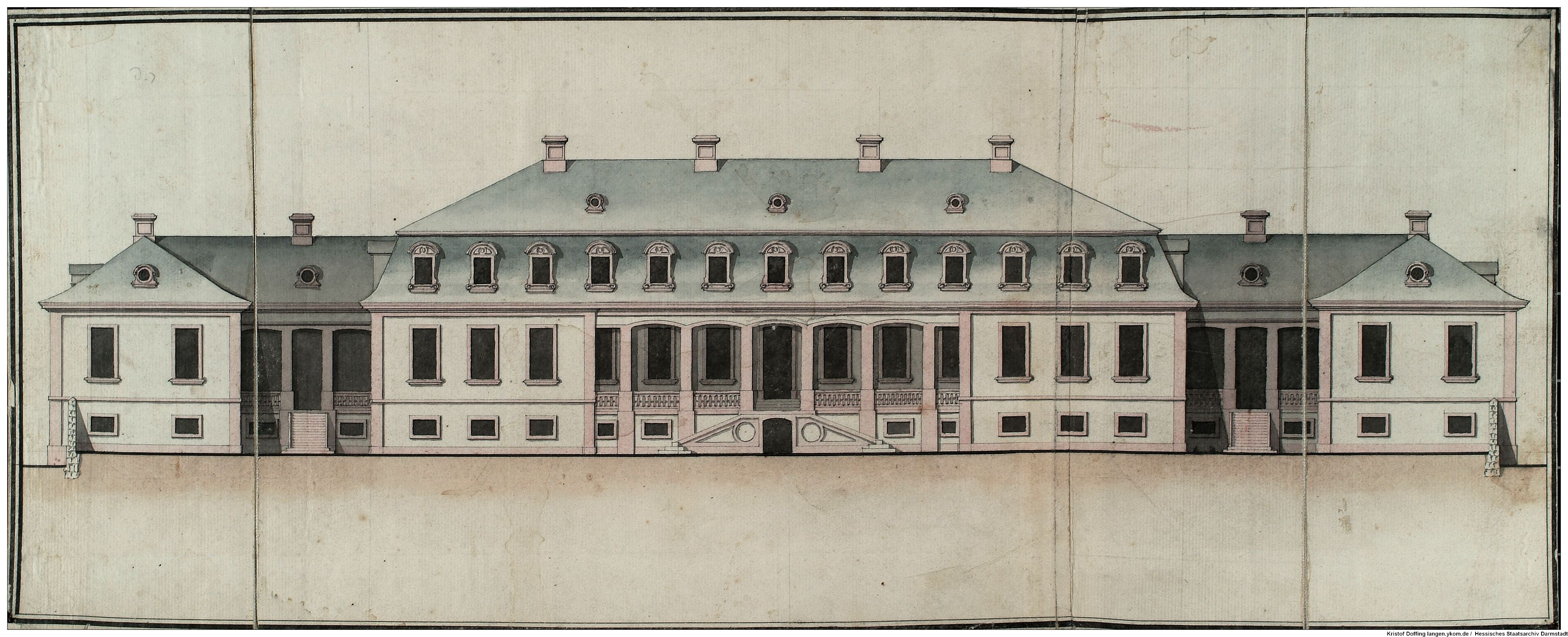
Proposal to rebuild and extend the main building

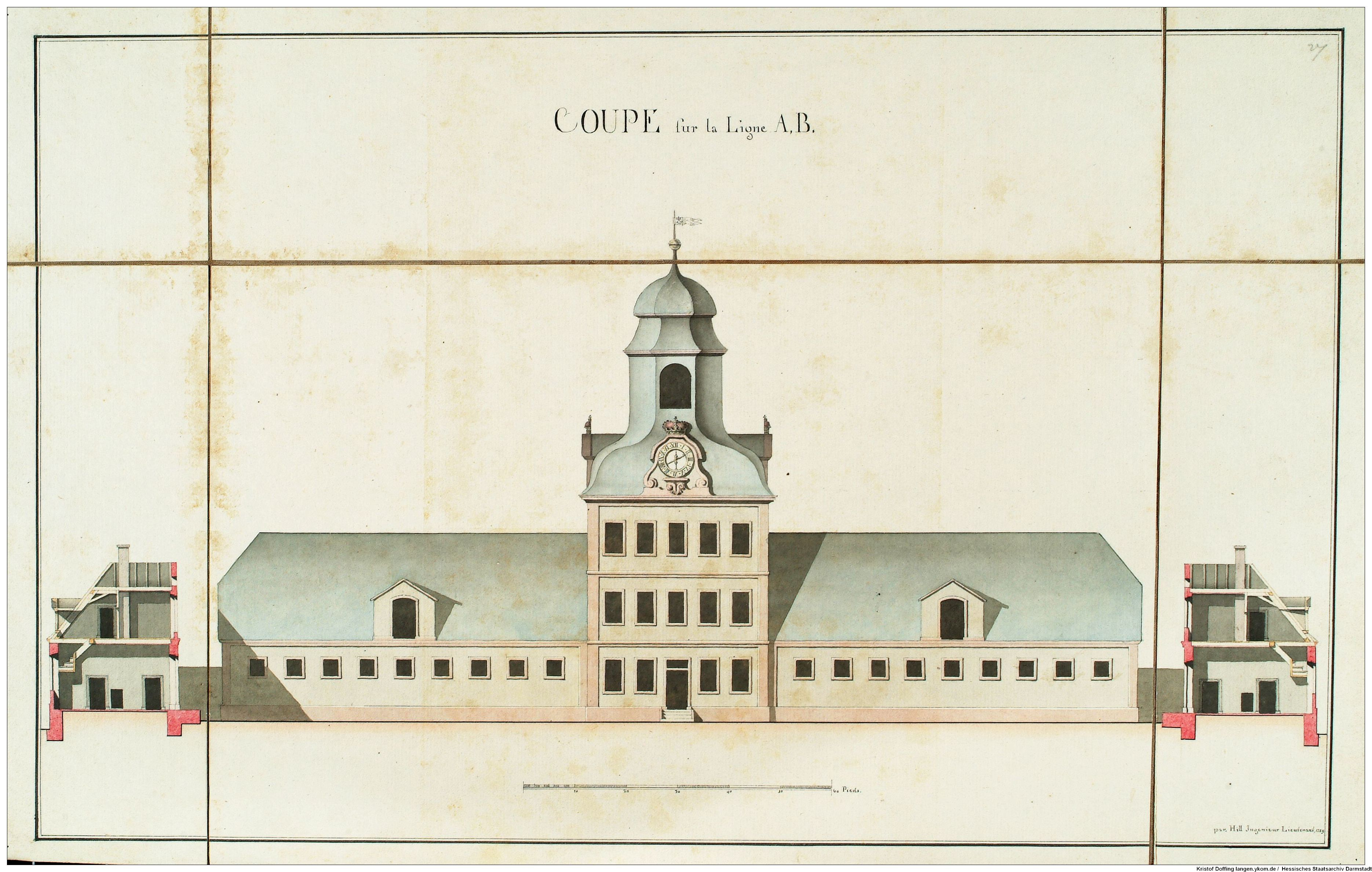
Entrance building with clock tower

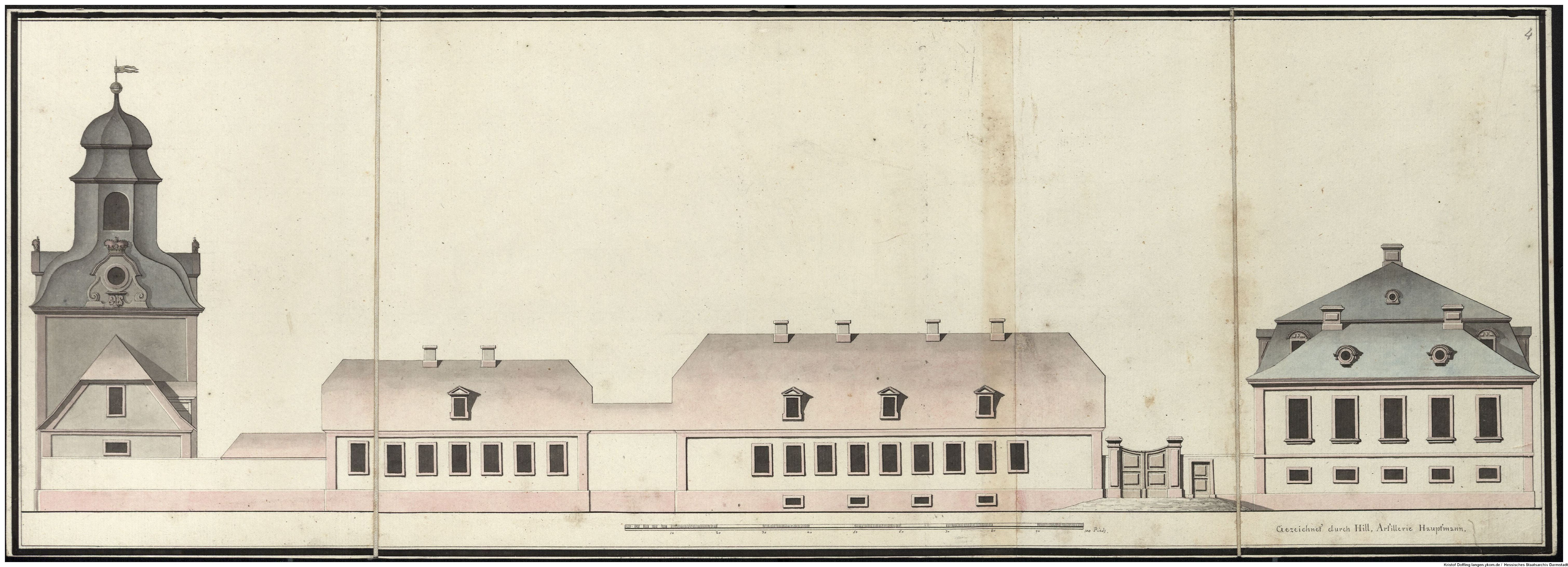
Side view of Schloss Wolfsgarten
