= Wedding of Prince Felipe and Letizia Ortiz =

Wedding of Spanish Royal

- Monogram of Felipe and Letizia as Prince and Princess of Asturias
- Date: 22 May 2004; 22 years ago
- Venue: Almudena Cathedral, Royal Palace of Madrid
- Location: Madrid, Spain
- Participants: Felipe, Prince of Asturias; Letizia Ortiz

The wedding of Felipe, Prince of Asturias and Letizia Ortiz was held on 22 May 2004 in the Almudena Cathedral at the Royal Palace of Madrid, Spain. At the time of the wedding, the groom was the heir to the Spanish throne. The bride was a journalist. The wedding was presided over by the archbishop of Madrid, Antonio María Rouco Varela, and was watched by 25 million people in Spain alone.

More than 1200 guests attended the wedding, including 36 royal houses and heads of state, including Albert, Hereditary Prince of Monaco; Charles, Prince of Wales, and the Crown Princess Victoria of Sweden.

The wedding was the first state wedding in Spain for more than 50 years. It was also the first wedding to be held in the Almudena Cathedral, which was consecrated in 1993.

== Engagement announcement ==
The exact date that the courtship began is unknown. On 1 November 2003, the Royal Household announced Letizia Ortiz's engagement to Felipe, then Prince of Asturias. Felipe had proposed with a 16-carat diamond engagement ring with a white gold trim. She marked the occasion by giving him white gold and sapphire cufflinks and a classic book.

The official hand petition was made on 6 November 2003 at the El Pardo Palace.

== Pre-wedding dinner gala ==
On 21 May 2004, a day before the wedding, the royal family held a gala dinner for their guests at the Royal Palace of El Pardo. The Spanish royal family presided at the four main tables. The dinner was attended by 300 guests.

Felipe and Letizia occupied the presidential table, along with Queen Margrethe of Denmark and her husband, Prince Henrik; the King and Queen of Norway, Harald and Sonja; the President of Ireland and her husband, Mary and Martin McAleese, and the president of El Salvador, Francisco Flores Pérez, and his wife, Lourdes Rodríguez.

At the table of King Juan Carlos I were Paloma Rocasolano, the mother of the bride; Queen Beatrix of the Netherlands; the Grand Dukes of Luxembourg, Henri and María Teresa; the president of Panama, Mireya Moscoso; the president of Kazakhstan, Nursultan Nazarbayev, and his daughter, Aliya and the president of Germany, Johannes Rau, and his wife, Christina.

At the table chaired by Queen Sofia were Jesus Ortiz, the father of the bride; the King and Queen of Sweden, Carl XVI Gustaf and Silvia; the King and Queen of the Belgians, Albert and Paola; Nelson Mandela and his wife, Graça Machel, and the president of Portugal, Jorge Sampaio, and his wife, Maria José Ritta.

At the table of the Infanta Elena and her husband Jaime de Marichalar were Erika Ortiz, sister of the bride, and her husband, Antonio Vigo Pérez; the Prince of Liechtenstein, Hans-Adam II; the Prince and Grand Master of the Sovereign Military Order of Malta, Andrew Bertie, and the President of Ecuador, Lucio Gutiérrez, and his wife, Ximena Bohórquez Romero.

At the table of the Infanta Cristina and her husband Iñaki Urdangarin were Telma Ortiz, sister of the bride; the president of Colombia, Álvaro Uribe; the President of Nicaragua, Enrique Bolaños, and his wife, Lila T. Abaunza, and the Prime Minister of Spain, José Luis Rodríguez Zapatero, and his wife, Sonsoles Espinosa.

After the dinner was over, the guests returned to the Room of the Austrias, where a dance was held.

== Wedding ==
There was no specific time set for the ceremony, although it was expected to be around 11:00 in the morning. It was planned that a wedding procession would accompany the groom to the cathedral, where he would wait for the bride to arrive.

At 10:42, the royal procession left by the Puerta del Rey of the Royal Palace of Madrid. Headed by an officer followed by six halberdiers, it consisted of:

- Infante Carlos and Princess Anne, Duke and Duchess of Calabria.
- Infanta Margarita and Carlos Zurita, Duchess and Duke of Soria.
- Infanta Cristina and Iñaki Urdangarin, Duchess and Duke of Palma of Mallorca.
- Infanta Elena and Jaime de Marichalar, Duchess and Duke of Lugo.
- King Juan Carlos I and Infanta Pilar, Duchess of Badajoz.
- Queen Sofía and Felipe, Prince of Asturias.

The bride arrived at 11:12 in the morning to the cathedral in a Rolls-Royce Phantom IV, instead of on foot as planned, due to the persistent, intense rain. When King Juan Carlos I entered the cathedral, the anthem of Spain sounded. At 11:49 there was the moment of giving consent. Once the ceremony was over, the bride and groom left the cathedral and toured the streets of Madrid.

=== Processional route ===
After the religious ceremony, the newlyweds took a tour by car, a black Rolls-Royce Phantom IV, through the streets of Madrid escorted by the Motorcycle Section of the Royal Guard. They proceeded from Bailén Street to the Cuesta de San Vicente to reach the Spain Square. They continued along the Gran Vía, passing through the Red de San Luis to Alcalá street, in the direction of Plaza de Cibeles.

The motorized escort was relieved by the escort on horseback of the Royal Escort Squadron, composed of a squadron of batters, a band of bugles and timbales, and a cuirassier section. They continued through the Paseo del Prado to the Emperor Charles V square and took the Barcelona City Avenue to reach the Basilica of Our Lady of Atocha, where they were received by the Mayor of Madrid, Alberto Ruiz-Gallardón, the Cardinal Archbishop of Madrid, Monsignor Antonio Maria Rouco Varela, and the Priest of the Basilica, Father José Antonio Álvarez. Once there, the Princess deposited the bridal bouquet before the image of the Virgin of Atocha, a traditional patron of Spanish royalty.

Once finished, the Prince and Princess of Asturias greeted the large audience present, then returned to the Royal Palace by the same route they had used on the outward journey. The couple and their families greeted the large crowd gathered in the Plaza de Oriente from the balcony of the Royal Palace.

=== Wedding banquet ===
After the tour of Madrid, the newlyweds went to the Royal Palace for the bridal banquet. In the banquet, both the King and Prince Felipe gave speeches.

The King's toast expressed to Letizia the enormous happiness and enthusiasm of the entire Royal Family for this event, asked the new spouses to always think of Spain, and to dedicate "with love and devotion, the best of your efforts to the Spaniards, to join their hopes, share their illusions and be able to always fuse with their feelings and difficulties", with the certainty that "you are inspired by the passion to serve this great, diverse and plural country, proud of its coexistence in democracy and freedom."

Prince Felipe replied, expressing his great happiness and saying that "we will always think of Spain and that our whole life will be dedicated to the welfare of the Spaniards." He thanked both families for their constant expressions of affection and generosity. The Prince finished with an emotional tribute to "the absent, those who were not criminally and brutally allowed to continue living their illusions and anxieties, and also those who today can not enjoy with them, free and civically of the Madrid spring that welcomes us and it raises our spirits" (in a clear reference to the victims of 11-M).

The royal menu was designed by Spanish chefs Ferran Adrià and Juan Mari Arzak and consisted of:

- A traditional appetizer that consisted of Jabugo ham, Manchego cheese, breaded Scallops and Croquettes among other delicacies and special breads.
- Puff pastry tartlet with seafood on a bed of vegetables.
- Roast capon with thyme and nuts.
- Cake.
- White and red wine along with cava.

==== Cake ====
The bridal cake was designed by Spanish cakemaker Francisco Torreblanca. The cake consisted of a kind of chocolate serpentine of different floors. Along with the cake, different desserts were served, among which was a new creation that joined the tastes of both the groom and the bride, and was named "Royal Gianduja".

=== Cost ===
The cost of the wedding was shared between the government (who assumed the majority of the budget for security and public decoration of the streets) and the Royal House (who was in charge of the banquet, the wedding, dresses, invitations, etc.). Some estimates calculate that it cost between €21 million and €40 million (approximately $28–54.5 million at that time).

There were numerous criticisms of RTVE for the high cost of retransmission of the wedding, which according to the corporation was €4.5 million, although former Minister Bono said it cost more than €13 million, something that the Corporation denies.

=== Wedding attire ===
==== Bride ====
Letizia wore the empire-style tiara with which Queen Sofia married, in platinum and diamonds. The wedding dress, designed by Manuel Pertegaz, was white, tight around the waist, with long sleeves, a neckline in the shape of a corolla, a wide skirt and a 4.5-meter long train embroidered with heraldic motifs. The bride's gown was woven with Valencia silk and embroidered with silver and gold threads. The nuptial veil was a gift from the Prince to Letizia; with a triangular shape, three meters long by two wide, of natural silk tulle in ivory white with scrolls and hand-embroidered wreaths, which mixed the fleur-de-lis and the spike. The shoes were made by the illicitana designer Pura López.

==== Groom ====
Felipe wore the Great Tag suit of the Army. The Emblem of the Infantry weapon was embroidered on the neck with golden thread, and in the cuffs were the badges corresponding to his use as Commander. The Prince also wore the Collar of the Order of the Golden Fleece. The Fleece or Vellocino hung from the necklace in enameled gold. He also carried the Grand Cross of the Necklace of the Order of Carlos III and the sky blue sash. Felipe also wore the Great Crosses of Military, Naval and Aeronautical Merit.

== Guests ==
The first invitations began to be sent in April 2004, consisting of three different letters. One of them signed by the Royals, another by the Chief of the Royal Household and another by the parents of the bride.

All letters were sent in English. The letter signed by the Chief of the Royal Household invited attendees to the religious ceremony at the Cathedral of Almudena on 22 May at 11:00 am. The letter signed by the Royals invites the attendees to the banquet held on the same day at 14:30. The letter signed by the bride's parents was limited to saying that they participate in the wedding.

=== Foreign royalty ===
==== Members of reigning royal families ====
- The Crown Prince of Bahrain (representing the King of Bahrain) and Sheikha Hala bint D'aij Al Khalifa
- The King and Queen of the Belgians
  - The Queen Fabiola of Belgium
  - (Belgium) The Duke and Duchess of Brabant
  - (Belgium) The Archduchess and Archduke of Austria-Este
  - The Prince Laurent and Princess Claire of Belgium
- The Queen and Prince Consort of Denmark
- The Crown Prince of Japan (representing the Emperor of Japan)
- The Queen of Jordan (representing the King of Jordan)
  - The Queen Dowager of Jordan
  - (Jordan) The Princess Raiyah bint Hussein
  - (Jordan) The Princess Muna Al Hussein
  - (Jordan) The Prince Faisal bin Hussein and Princess Alia bin Faisal
  - (Jordan) The Prince Talal bin Muhammad and Princess Ghida Talal
  - (Jordan) The Princess Sarvath El Hassan
  - (Jordan) The Prince Rashid bin Hassan
- The Sheikh Nasser Al-Mohammed Al-Sabah (representing the Emir of Kuwait)
- The Sovereign Prince of Liechtenstein
  - The Prince Nikolaus and Princess Margaretha of Liechtenstein
  - (Liechtenstein) The Dowager Marchioness of Mariño
- The Grand Duke and Grand Duchess of Luxembourg
  - The Hereditary Grand Duke of Luxembourg
  - The Prince Guillaume of Luxembourg
  - The Prince Jean of Luxembourg
  - (Luxembourg) The Archduchess Marie Astrid and Archduke Carl Christian of Austria
- The Hereditary Prince of Monaco (representing the Sovereign Prince of Monaco)
  - (Monaco) The Princess and Prince of Hannover
- The Prince Moulay Rachid (representing the King of Morocco)
- The Queen of the Netherlands
  - The Prince of Orange and Princess Máxima of the Netherlands
  - The Prince Constantijn and Princess Laurentien of the Netherlands
- The King and Queen of Norway
  - The Crown Prince and Crown Princess of Norway
  - (Norway) The Princess Märtha Louise and Mr. Ari Behn
- The Sayyid Haitham bin Tariq Al Said, Minister of Heritage and Culture (representing the Sultan of Oman)
- The Sheikh Joaan bin Hamad Al Thani (representing the Emir of Qatar)
- The Prince Salman bin Abdulaziz Al Saud, Governor of Riyadh Province (representing the King of Saudi Arabia)
- The King and Queen of Sweden
  - The Crown Princess of Sweden
  - (Sweden) The Duke of Värmland
  - (Sweden) The Duchess of Hälsingland and Gästrikland
  - (Sweden) Mr. Gustaf Magnuson (son of Princess Christina, Mrs. Magnuson)
- The Sheikh Abdullah bin Zayed Al Nahyan, Minister of Information and Culture (representing the Emir of Abu Dhabi and President of the United Arab Emirates)
- The Prince of Wales (representing the Queen of the United Kingdom)

==== Members of non-reigning royal families ====
- King Constantine II and Queen Anne-Marie of Greece
  - Crown Prince Pavlos and Crown Princess Marie-Chantal of Greece
  - Princess Alexia of Greece and Denmark and Mr. Carlos Morales
  - The Prince Nikolaos of Greece and Denmark
  - The Princess Theodora of Greece and Denmark
  - The Prince Philippos of Greece and Denmark
- The Princess Irene of Greece and Denmark
- The Prince and Princess Michael of Greece and Denmark
  - The Princess Olga of Greece
- The Prince and Princess of Turnovo
- The Prince and Princess of Preslav
- The Prince Kubrat and Princess Carla of Bulgaria
- The Prince Konstantin-Assen and Princess María of Bulgaria
- The Princess Kalina of Bulgaria and Mr. Kitín Muñoz
- The Empress Farah Pahlavi of Iran
  - The Crown Prince and Crown Princess of Iran
- The King Michael I of Romania
  - Crown Princess Margareta and Prince Radu of Romania
- The Prince and Princess of Naples
  - The Prince and Princess of Venice
  - The Princess Maria Gabriella of Savoy
  - The Duke and Duchess of Aosta
    - The Duke of Apulia
- The Duke and Duchess of Braganza
- The Crown Prince and Crown Princess of Yugoslavia
  - The Philip, Hereditary Prince of Yugoslavia
  - The Prince Dimitri of Yugoslavia
- The Count and Countess of Paris
- The Grand Duchess Maria Vladimirovna of Russia
- The Prince of Prussia
- The Prince and Princess Heinrich of Hanover
  - The Princess Alexandra of Leiningen
- The Margrave and Margravine of Baden
- Duke of Bavaria
- The Landgrave of Hesse
  - The Hereditary Prince and Hereditary Princess of Hesse
- The Princess Béatrice d'Orléans
- The Princess Clotilde d'Orléans and Mr. Edouard Crépy
- The Princess Adélaïde d'Orléans and Mr. Pierre-Louis Dailly
- The Prince François d'Orléans
- The Duke of Württemberg
- The Archduke Karl and Archduchess Francesca of Austria
- The Archduke Georg and Archduchess Eilika of Austria
- The Archduchess Sophie of Austria and Prince of Windisch-Graetz
- The Archduke Martin and Archduchess Katharina of Austria
- The Archduchess Monika of Austria and Luis María de Casanova-Cárdenas, Duke of Santángelo
- The Archduchess Catharina of Austria and Count Massimiliano Secco d'Aragona
- The Archduke Maximilian of Austria
- The Archduke Philipp of Austria
- The Archduchess Maria Immaculata, Countess von und zu Hoensbroech
- The Prince Pedro Carlos of Orléans-Braganza
- The Princess Maria da Glória, Duchess of Segorbe
- The Prince Manuel of Orléans-Braganza
- The Princess Teresa of Orléans-Braganza
- Gustav, Hereditary Prince of Sayn-Wittgenstein-Berleburg
- Princess Alexandra of Sayn-Wittgenstein-Berleburg and Count Jefferson von Pfeil und Klein-Ellguth
- Prince Alois-Konstantin of Löwenstein-Wertheim-Rosenberg and Princess Anastasia of Prussia
- The Hereditary Count and Countess of Törring-Jettenbach

=== Non-royal dignitaries ===
- Elvira Salinas Gamarra, First Lady of Bolivia
- Álvaro Uribe Vélez, President of Colombia
  - Andrés Pastrana Arango, Former President of Colombia, and wife Nohra Puyana de Pastrana
  - Belisario Betancur, Former President of Colombia, and wife Dalita Rafaela Navarro Palmar
- Leila Rodríguez Stahl, First Lady of Costa Rica
- Václav Havel, Former President of Czech Republic, and wife Dagmar Havlová
- Lucio Edwin Gutiérrez Borbúa, President of Ecuador, and First Lady Ximena Bohórquez
- Francisco Flores Pérez, President of El Salvador, and First Lady Lourdes Rodríguez de Flores
- Bernadette Chirac, First Lady of France
- Johannes Rau, President of Germany, and First Lady Christina Rau
- (Republic of Ireland) Mary McAleese, President of Ireland, and First Gentleman Martin McAleese
- Nursultan Nazarbayev, President of Kazakhstan, and First Lady Sara Nazarbayeva
- Enrique José Bolaños Geyer, President of Nicaragua, and First Lady Lila Abaunza
- Mireya Moscoso, President of Panama
- Eliane Karp, First Lady of Peru
- Jorge Sampaio, President of Portugal, and First Lady Maria José Ritta
- Nelson Mandela, Former President of South Africa, and wife Graça Machel
- José Luis Rodríguez Zapatero, Prime Minister of Spain, and wife Sonsoles Espinosa
  - Felipe González Márquez, Former Prime Minister of Spain
  - José María Aznar López, Former Prime Minister of Spain
  - (Spain) Carmen Romero López, Member of the Spanish Parliament

== Title upon marriage ==
With the marriage of Felipe and Letizia, she received all the constitutional titles that are recognized to the Prince as heir to the Spanish throne; the couple are known since then as:

- The Prince and Princess of Asturias, the title of the heir of the Crown of Castile.
- The Prince and Princess of Gerona, the title of the heir of the Crown of Aragón.
- The Prince and Princess of Viana, the title of the heir of the Kingdom of Navarre.
- The Duke and Duchess of Montblanch.
- The Count and Countess of Cervera.
- The Lord and Lady of Balaguer.

Also, Letizia obtained the treatment of Royal Highness.

== Tribute to the victims of 11-M ==
At 8:00 on the day of the wedding, a Lieutenant Colonel of the Army, escorted by two soldiers of the Royal Guard, deposited a wreath of flowers with the phrase: "Always in our memory, Felipe and Letizia" in the Forest of the Absent (currently Forest of Remembrance), a composition in the center of the Emperor Charles V square with trees and flowers, in memory of the victims of the terrorist attacks of 11-M.

== Coverage ==
Televisión Española produced the live institutional television signal that was distributed to all major networks in Spain, reaching a national record as the most-watched television program ever with 25.1 million viewers. These audience data exceed those reached by the weddings of the Prince's sisters. The wedding of Infanta Cristina was followed by 22.7 million viewers and the wedding of Infanta Elena by 21.4 million viewers.

The live institutional television signal was also distributed abroad, with a potential audience of 1.2–2 billion. Nearly 5,600 media outlets from around the world covered the wedding.
