= Wedding of Infanta Elena and Jaime de Marichalar =

1995 Royal Wedding

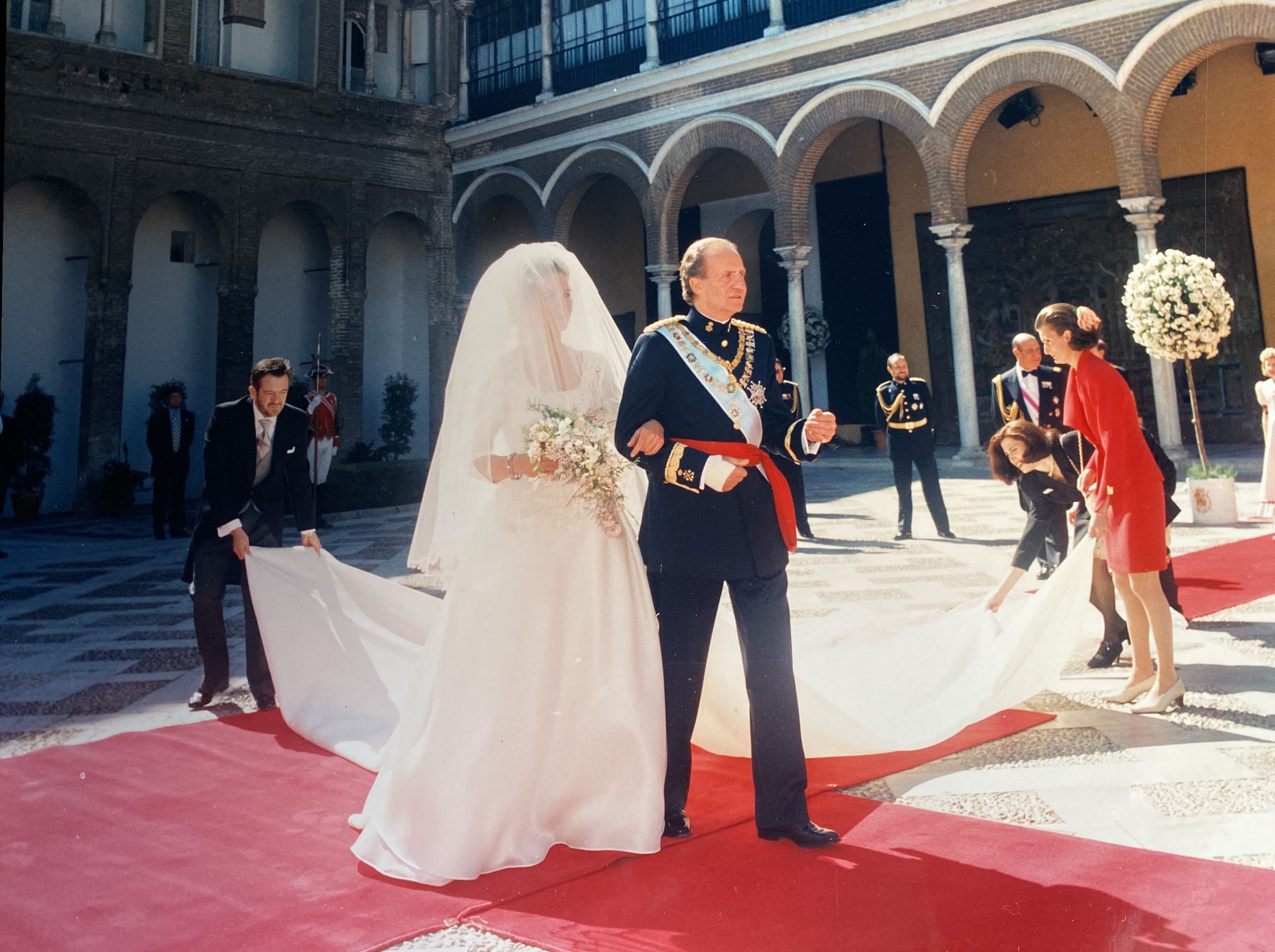
- Infanta Elena departs the Royal Alcázar of Seville of the arm of her father for her wedding to Jaime de Marichalar
- Date: 18 March 1995; 31 years ago
- Venue: Seville Cathedral; Royal Alcázar of Seville
- Location: Seville, Andalusia, Spain
- Participants: Infanta Elena of Spain; Jaime de Marichalar

The wedding of Infanta Elena of Spain and Don Jaime de Marichalar y Sáenz de Tejada, Lord of Tejada, took place on Saturday, 18 March 1995 at Seville Cathedral in Seville, Andalusia.

Infanta Elena is the eldest child of King Juan Carlos I and Queen Sofía of Spain, at the time of her marriage, she was second in line to the Spanish throne. Marichalar, a Spanish nobleman, is the third son of Amalio de Marichalar y Bruguera, 8th Count of Ripalda (1912–1979), and María de la Concepción Sáenz de Tejada y Fernández de Boadilla, Countess of Ripalda, Lady of Tejada (1929–2014).

This wedding was the first royal wedding celebrated in Spain in 89 years.

== Engagement ==
Infanta Elena, the elder daughter of King Juan Carlos I and Queen Sofía of Spain, met Spanish nobleman Jaime de Marichalar, in Paris in 1987. Elena was studying French literature and Marichalar was working for Credit Suisse. Their relationship remained private until 1993 when the press first photographed them and rumours of an engagement began. Their engagement was announced on 23 November 1994. Their engagement was celebrated at the Palace of Zarzuela on 26 November with members of the Spanish royal family in attendance.

Marichalar presented the Infanta with a diamond engagement ring created with diamonds from a tiara belonging to his mother. In turn, Infanta Elena presented her fiancé with a watch

=== Pre-wedding celebrations ===
On 17 March, the couple with their families attended a performance by the Royal Andalusian School of Equestrian Art at the Plaza de toros de la Real Maestranza de Caballería de Sevilla.

That evening, a dinner for family members and foreign royal guests was held at the home of the bride's great-aunt and great-uncle, Princess María de la Esperanza and Prince Pedro Gastão of Orléans-Braganza, in Villamanrique de la Condesa.

== Royal dukedom ==
On 3 March 1995, King Juan Carlos created his daughter Duchess of Lugo, a substantive title. The Royal Decree stated:

In attention to the circumstances that occur in My very dear daughter Her Royal Highness Doña Elena de Borbón, Infanta of Spain, on the occasion of her marriage and as proof of My deep affection and love, I have seen fit to grant her, for life, the power to use the title of Duchess of Lugo.
This is what I provide by this Royal Decree.

— JUAN CARLOS R., Royal Decree n.º 323 of 3 March 1995.

Upon marriage, Marichalar became duke consort and remained so until the couple divorced in 2010.

== Wedding ==
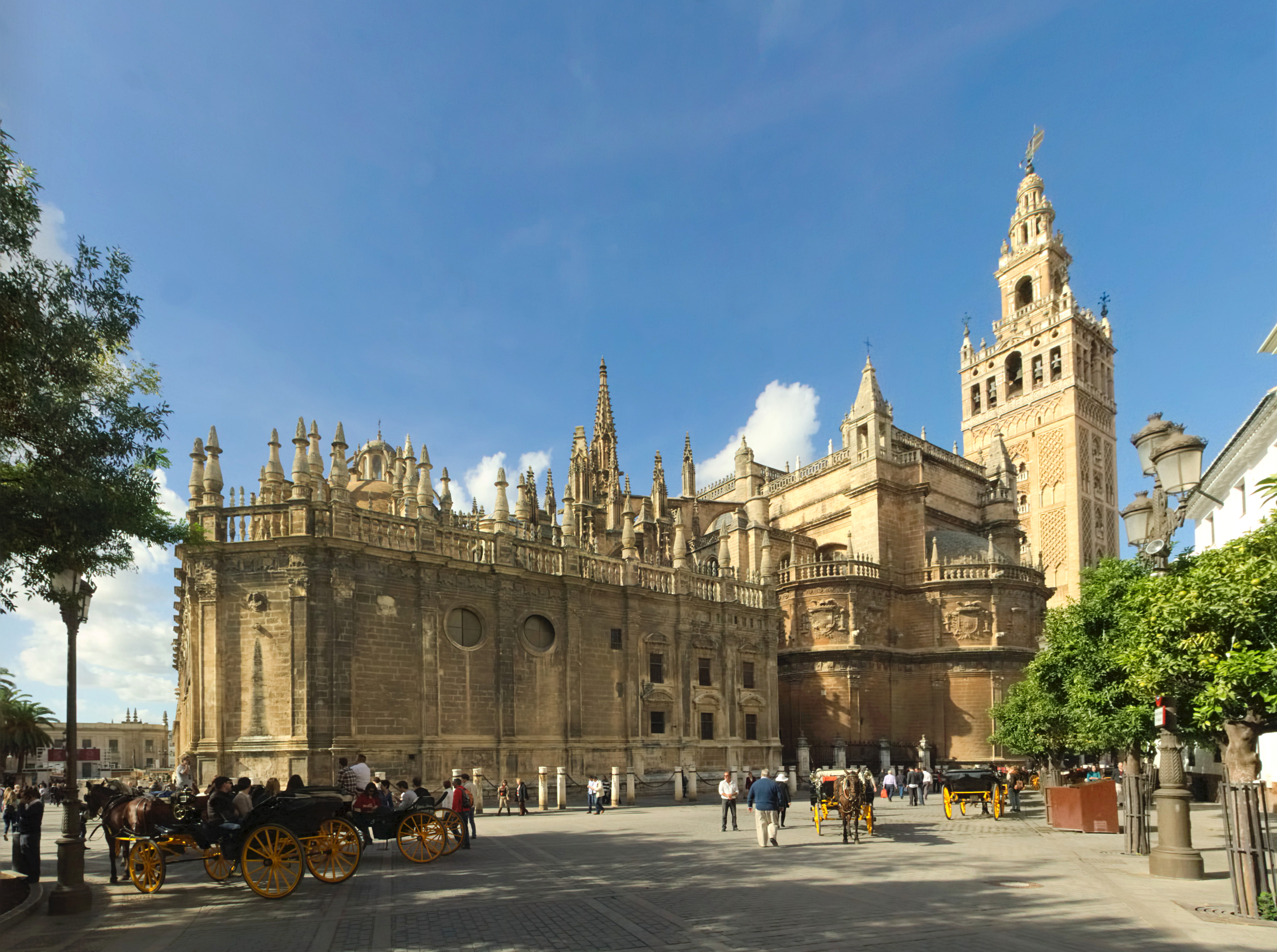
The southeast façade of Seville Cathedral, where the wedding was celebrated

=== Wedding service ===
The doors of Seville Cathedral opened early in the morning for guests to arrive. Political representatives, Spanish high society and friends of the couple were the first to arrive. Felipe González, Prime Minister of Spain, was the last to arrive before the groom and members of foreign royal families. Don Jaime and his mother arrived together, departing from the Hotel Alfonso XIII.

At 12:15 local time, a procession consisting of the members of the Spanish royal family departed the Royal Alcázar of Seville for the cathedral. The bride on the arm of her father followed at 12:30 local time. As the bride and her father arrived at the cathedral, the Marcha Real, Spain's national anthem, was played on the organ.

The readings were an extract from the First Epistle to the Corinthians, Psalm 119, and Gospel of John: 9-12. The Archbishop gave the homily before the marriage rite took place.

=== Broadcast ===
Televisión Española (TVE) produced the live institutional television signal, directed by Pilar Miró, that was distributed to all major networks in Spain. TVE itself broke its all-time record for morning audience, with more than 8.6 million viewers, and 71.4% share in average. Counting the national networks –without counting the regional ones–, the wedding attracted more than 10.5 million viewers.

== Attendees ==
=== Foreign royalty ===
==== Members of reigning royal families ====
- (Belgium) The Queen of the Belgians (representing the King of the Belgians)
  - (Belgium) The Duke of Brabant
- The Sultan of Brunei
- The Prince Norodom Ranariddh, First Prime Minister of Cambodia, and Princess Norodom Marie Ranariddh (representing the King of Cambodia)
- The Princess Benedikte of Denmark and Prince of Sayn-Wittgenstein-Berleburg (representing the Queen of Denmark)
- The Queen of Jordan (representing the King of Jordan)
  - The Crown Prince and Crown Princess of Jordan
  - The Prince Hamzah bin Hussein of Jordan
  - The Princess Ghida Talal of Jordan
- The Princess Consort of Liechtenstein (representing the Sovereign Prince of Liechtenstein)
  - The Prince Nikolaus and Princess Margaretha of Liechtenstein
  - The Princess Tatjana of Liechtenstein
  - The Prince Philipp of Liechtenstein
- The Grand Duchess of Luxembourg (representing the Grand Duke of Luxembourg)
  - The Hereditary Grand Duke and Hereditary Grand Duchess of Luxembourg
  - The Prince Guillaume and Princess Sibilla of Luxembourg
  - (Luxembourg) The Archduchess Marie Astrid and Archduke Carl Christian of Austria
- The Sovereign Prince of Monaco
  - The Hereditary Prince of Monaco
- The Princess Lalla Hasna of Morocco (representing the King of Morocco) and Khalid Benharbit
- The Queen of the Netherlands
  - (Netherlands) The Prince of Orange
  - The Prince Johan Friso of the Netherlands
  - The Prince Constantijn of the Netherlands
- The Crown Prince of Norway (representing the King of Norway)
  - The Princess Märtha Louise of Norway
- The Prince Sultan bin Salman bin Abdulaziz al-Saud of Saudi Arabia (representing the King of Saudi Arabia)
- The Crown Princess of Sweden
  - (Sweden) The Princess Désirée, Baroness Silfverschiöld
- The Sheikh Sultan bin Zayed bin Sultan Al Nahyan (representing the Emir of Abu Dhabi and President of the United Arab Emirates)
- The Prince of Wales (representing the Queen of the United Kingdom)

==== Members of non-reigning royal families ====
- King Constantine II and Queen Anne-Marie of Greece
  - Crown Prince Pavlos and his fiancée Marie-Chantal Miller
  - The Princess Alexia of Greece and Denmark
  - The Princess Theodora of Greece and Denmark
  - The Prince Philippos of Greece and Denmark
- The Princess Irene of Greece and Denmark
- The Prince and Princess Michael of Greece and Denmark
  - The Princess Alexandra of Greece
  - The Princess Olga of Greece
- The King Michael I and Queen Anne of Romania
- The Empress Farah Pahlavi of Iran
  - The Prince Ali Reza Pahlavi of Iran
  - The Princess Farahnaz Pahlavi of Iran
- The Tsar Simeon II and Tsaritsa Margarita of Bulgaria
  - The Prince of Tarnovo
  - The Prince and Princess of Preslav
  - The Prince Kubrat and Carla María de la Soledad Royo-Villanova y Urrestarazu
  - The Prince Konstantin-Assen and María García de la Rasilla y Gortázar
  - The Princess Kalina of Bulgaria
- The Prince and Princess of Naples
  - The Prince of Venice and Piedmont
  - The Princess Maria Gabriella of Savoy
  - The Duke and Duchess of Aosta
- The Countess of Paris
  - The Princess Béatrice d'Orléans
- The Alix, Princess Napoléon
- The Duchess of Anjou and Segovia
  - The Duke of Anjou
  - The Duke and the Duchess of Aquitaine
- The Crown Prince and Crown Princess of Yugoslavia
- The Duke of Braganza
- The Grand Duchess Leonida Georgievna of Russia
  - The Grand Duchess Maria Vladimirovna of Russia
- The Prince Ernest August of Hannover
- The Prince Georg Friedrich of Prussia
- The Duke of Bavaria
- The Landgrave of Hesse
- The Margrave and Margravine of Baden
- The Archduke Otto von Habsburg and Archduchess Regina of Austria
  - The Archduke Karl and Archduchess Francesca of Austria
  - The Archduke Georg of Austria
  - The Archduchess Sophie of Austria and Prince of Windisch-Graetz
- The Duke and Duchess of Württemberg
  - Eberhard, Hereditary Duke of Württemberg
  - The Duchess Mathilde and Count Enrich of Waldburg-Zeil
- The Aga Khan IV
