= Hany M. Sala'am =

- هاني سلام
- Born: c. 1930s Lebanon
- Other names: Hany Salaam
- Occupation: Businessman
- Known for: Chairman and CEO of Gulf Resources Corporation
- Children: 2, including Princess Ghida Talal

Hany M. Sala'am (Arabic: هاني سلام) is a Lebanese businessman who is the current chairman and CEO of Gulf Resources Corporation (GRC) an international group of companies specialising in the exploration and development of energy, mining and smelting of related natural resources.

Sala'am graduated with a Bachelor of Science in Civil Engineering. Sala'am became a successful entrepreneur from the outset of his career establishing a network of companies throughout the Middle East, Europe, North America and Africa and has acted as Chairman to GRC since its inception.

== Family background ==
Sala'am born in Lebanon was raised in a successful business and politically orientated family which formed the basis of his future entrepreneurial and diplomatic activities. His father Muhammad Salaam in partnership with his paternal uncle Saeb Salaam founded Middle East Airlines (Lebanon’s national airline) in 1948. Saeb Salaam also served as Prime Minister of Lebanon as did another of Sala'am's paternal uncles Rashid Karami. On Sala'am's maternal side his uncle Dr. Hussein Fakri Khalidi served as Prime Minister of Jordan.

Sala'am's eldest daughter Ghida married HRH Prince Talal Bin Muhammad a Jordanian Royal in Amman July, 1991. They have two sons and one daughter: Prince Hussein, Prince Muhammad & Princess Raaja. Princess Ghida acts as chairperson to the King Hussein Cancer Center in Jordan.

== Political endeavours ==
Sala'am served his country as a Presidential Envoy under the governments of Presidents Suleiman Franjieh, Elias Sarkis and Amin Gemayel. He achieved success as Head of the Lebanese delegation and with his partner Mahdi Al Tajir negotiated with the late President Hafez al-Assad, securing the peace accords (known as Taif) which ended the Lebanese Civil War.

== Gulf Resources Corporation (GRC) ==
GRC was formed in the late 1979 by its current Chairman (Sala'am), and began operations as a civil engineering contractor. Shortly after, an association with the Kaiser Aluminium Company led to the success of Alba, the first aluminium smelting company in Bahrain.

GRC then embarked on a grand smelter scheme with Kaiser Aluminium to launch a massive joint venture including oil refining and aluminium smelting in Qatar, UAE & Saudi Arabia. This development set the course for the emergence of gas and oil based process industries that expanded on a global scale. GRC also owned and operated a manganese mine in Western Australia under the leadership of Simon Farrell. The group since has diversified into a wide field of operations.

These include engineering, industrial management, project management, real estate development, finance and investment, representation and trading. The successful development of GRC owes much to the contributions of key individuals who served for periods as board members. These include Timothy Ready (Chairman & CEO of Kaiser Aluminium and President of Primary Producers of Aluminium), Jean Ping & Lord Hanson.

In 1996 Sala'am and GRC was involved in a commercial dispute with Dubal Aluminium. The dispute was later settled out of court in 1998.

== Philanthropy ==
Sala'am supports various charitable and educational ventures. One of his most notable educational ventures was the establishment of Sala'am Intercultural Resource Centre in Georgetown University, Washington DC. The Sala'am Centre was established by a grant from the Sala'am Family and dedicated by former president Jimmy Carter in 1989.

The Sala'am Centre houses them Master of Science in Foreign Services (MSFS) programme. The centre provides its students with exclusive educational tools/materials and organises high-profile seminars aimed at the promotion of a better international and cultural understanding. Sala'am has also been known to personally sponsor the University education of many deserving student.

== Recognitions ==
HM King Ja'afar of Malaysia bestowed on Sala'am the prestigious Honours Knight Grand Commander of the Most Blessed Grand Order of Tuanku Jaafar (SPTJ) with title of Dato' Seri (1997) and was also awarded with the Congressional Medal of Honour of the Philippines.
