= Princess Elizabeth of Greece and Denmark =

Princess Elizabeth
- Countess of Törring-Jettenbach
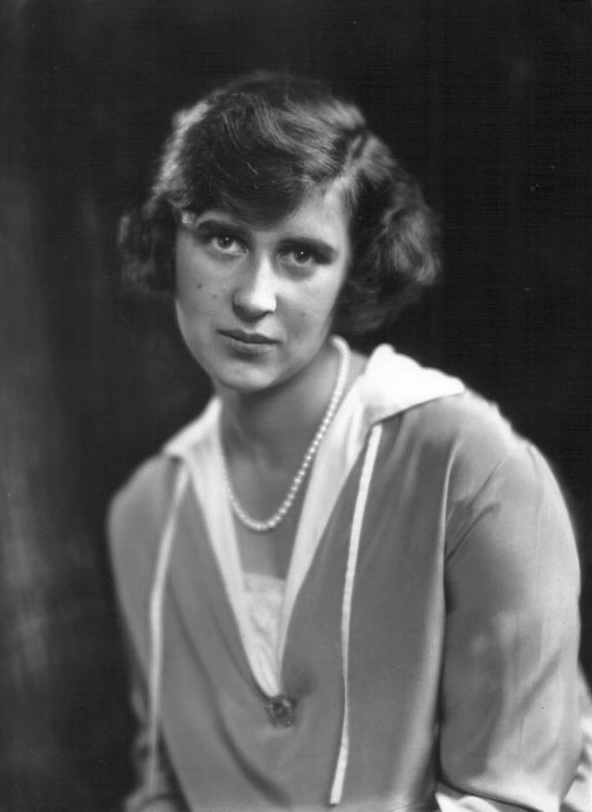
- Elizabeth in 1924
- Born: 24 May 1904; Tatoi Palace, Tatoi, Kingdom of Greece
- Died: 11 January 1955 (aged 50); Munich, Bavaria, Germany
- Burial: Winhöring, Bavaria, Germany
- Spouse: Carl Theodor, Count of Törring-Jettenbach (m. 1934)
- Issue Detail: Hans Veit, Count of Törring-Jettenbach; Archduchess Helene of Austria
- House: Glücksburg
- Father: Prince Nicholas of Greece and Denmark
- Mother: Grand Duchess Elena Vladimirovna of Russia

Princess Elizabeth of Greece and Denmark (Greek: Ελισάβετ; 24 May 1904 – 11 January 1955) was a Greek and Danish princess who became Countess of Törring-Jettenbach upon marrying Bavarian count Carl Theodor of Törring-Jettenbach. (Note: The spelling "Toerring" is also used in sources.)

The second of three daughters of Prince Nicholas of Greece and Denmark and Grand Duchess Elena Vladimirovna of Russia, Princess Elizabeth spent her childhood between the Kingdom of Greece and the Russian Empire. However, the First World War and the divisions it brought to Greece forced the teenager and her family into exile in Switzerland between 1917 and 1920. Returning to her country after the restoration of King Constantine I, she was banished once again by the proclamation of the Second Hellenic Republic in 1924.

Settled in Paris with her parents and sisters, the princess then undertook numerous trips that took her to visit her extended family in the United Kingdom, Italy, Yugoslavia, Romania, and Germany. Penniless and single, the princess sold her image to an American cosmetics brand. After unsuccessful attempts at courtships with the Prince of Wales, the Prince of Piedmont, Prince Nicholas of Romania, and Lord Ivor Spencer-Churchill, Elizabeth married Count Carl Theodor of Törring-Jettenbach, head of a high-profile Bavarian house, in 1934. The couple then settled between Munich and Winhöring, where they had two children, Hans Veit (born 1935) and Helene (born 1937).

At the time of Elizabeth's arrival in Germany, Adolf Hitler had just established his dictatorship, and although the princess and her husband never joined the Nazi Party, they felt its full influence. Used for their family ties to the Prince Regent of Yugoslavia and the Duke of Kent, husbands of Elizabeth's sisters, the Törrings were required to support the Führer's policies together with some other relatives, which led to tensions during the Second World War.

Isolated from her family after the Third Reich's invasion of Yugoslavia (1941), Elizabeth emerged weakened from the global conflict, but nevertheless regained her place within the European royalty. Suffering from cancer, she died in 1955 and her remains were buried in the Törring family mausoleum in Winhöring.

== Biography ==
=== Early childhood (1904–1909) ===
==== Childhood in Greece ====
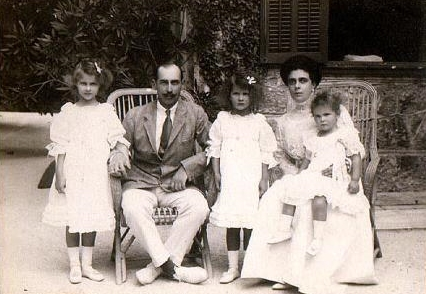
Elizabeth's family, in 1909. From left to right, Princess Olga, Prince Nicholas, Princess Elizabeth, Grand Duchess Elena, and Princess Marina appear.

Second daughter of Prince Nicholas of Greece and Denmark and Grand Duchess Elena Vladimirovna of Russia, Princess Elizabeth was born on 24 May 1904, at the Tatoi Palace. Nicknamed "Woolly" because of her thick hair, she was born less than a year after her older sister Olga, with whom she became very close as she grew up. Two years later, the family expanded again with the arrival of Princess Marina, who did not quite have the same closeness with her elder sisters.

Regularly dressed identically by their mother, the three girls grew up in a loving and united home. Together and to their parents the girls generally spoke in English, and it was this language that they used most spontaneously, even though they had a perfect command of Greek, which they spoke among themselves while abroad when they did not want to be understood. During their early childhood, Elizabeth and her sisters received a relatively simple education, under the supervision of a British governess named Kate Fox. Raised in the Orthodox faith, the princesses received their religious instruction from Ioulía Somáki-Karólou, a friend of their paternal grandmother, Queen Olga.

In Greece, Elizabeth and her family resided at the Nicholas Palace, (Note: The building now houses the embassy of Italy in Greece. See: "Gallery". Ambasciata d'Italia (in Italian).) an Athenian wedding gift from the Tsar of Russia to his cousin. During the reign of George I, the family also stayed regularly in Tatoi, where Elizabeth and her sisters were happy to meet up with their many Greek cousins. After Constantine I's accession to the throne, however, the princess's parents acquired their own second home, in Kifissia. With Kate Fox being a fan of outdoor activities, Elizabeth regularly visited the beaches of Vouliagmeni and Phalerum, where she enjoyed swimming and sunbathing. Together with their parents, she and her sisters also used to visit archaeological sites, museums and art galleries.

==== Travel and family relationships ====
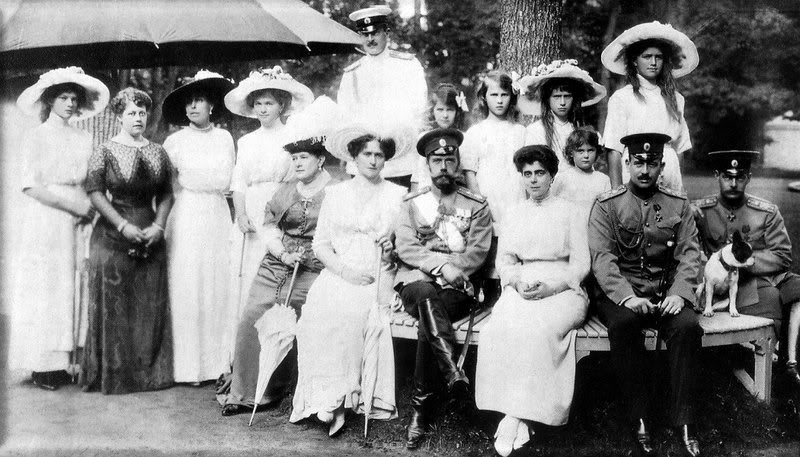
Family gathering around Tsar Nicholas II and his wife. Elizabeth is sitting just above the Emperor (c. 1910).

Prince Nicholas and his wife travelled to Russia once or twice a year, and Elizabeth and her sisters spent time in their mother's country from their early childhood. Their first visit to the Russian Empire coincided with the 1905 revolution, which forced the princesses to leave Saint Petersburg in a hurry and find refuge in Schwerin with their maternal grandmother.

For the girls, these trips to Russia were an opportunity to meet their numerous Romanov relatives: first the Vladimirovich branch (in other words, Grand Duke Vladimir Alexandrovich, Grand Duchess Maria Pavlovna, their three sons and their families), then the Konstantinovich branch (descended from Grand Duke Konstantin Nikolayevich, maternal grandfather of Prince Nicholas) and finally the main branch of the imperial family (and in particular the three younger children of Tsar Nicholas II, who were closer in age to the Greek princesses).

While Grand Duke Vladimir intimidated his granddaughters with his booming voice, Grand Duchess Maria Pavlovna proved to be a loving and generous grandmother, pampering the princesses while carefully monitoring their upbringing and manners. The Grand Duchess, however, caused significant issues in the lives of Elizabeth and her sisters. In 1913, Maria Pavlovna forced her daughter and son-in-law to dismiss Kate Fox, under threat of depriving them of all financial support if they refused. The Englishwoman was then separated from the girls, without even being able to say goodbye. Despite this event, Elizabeth and her family retained all their affection for the governess, who returned to their service in 1921, a few months after the death of Maria Pavlovna.

Besides Russia, Princess Elizabeth explored, at a very young age, the United Kingdom, Germany, France, and Italy. With her parents and her elder sister, she also visited Constantinople, where she met the Ottoman sultan Abdul Hamid II in 1905.

=== Political turbulence (1909–1920) ===
==== Rise of Venizelos and the Balkan Wars (1909–1913) ====
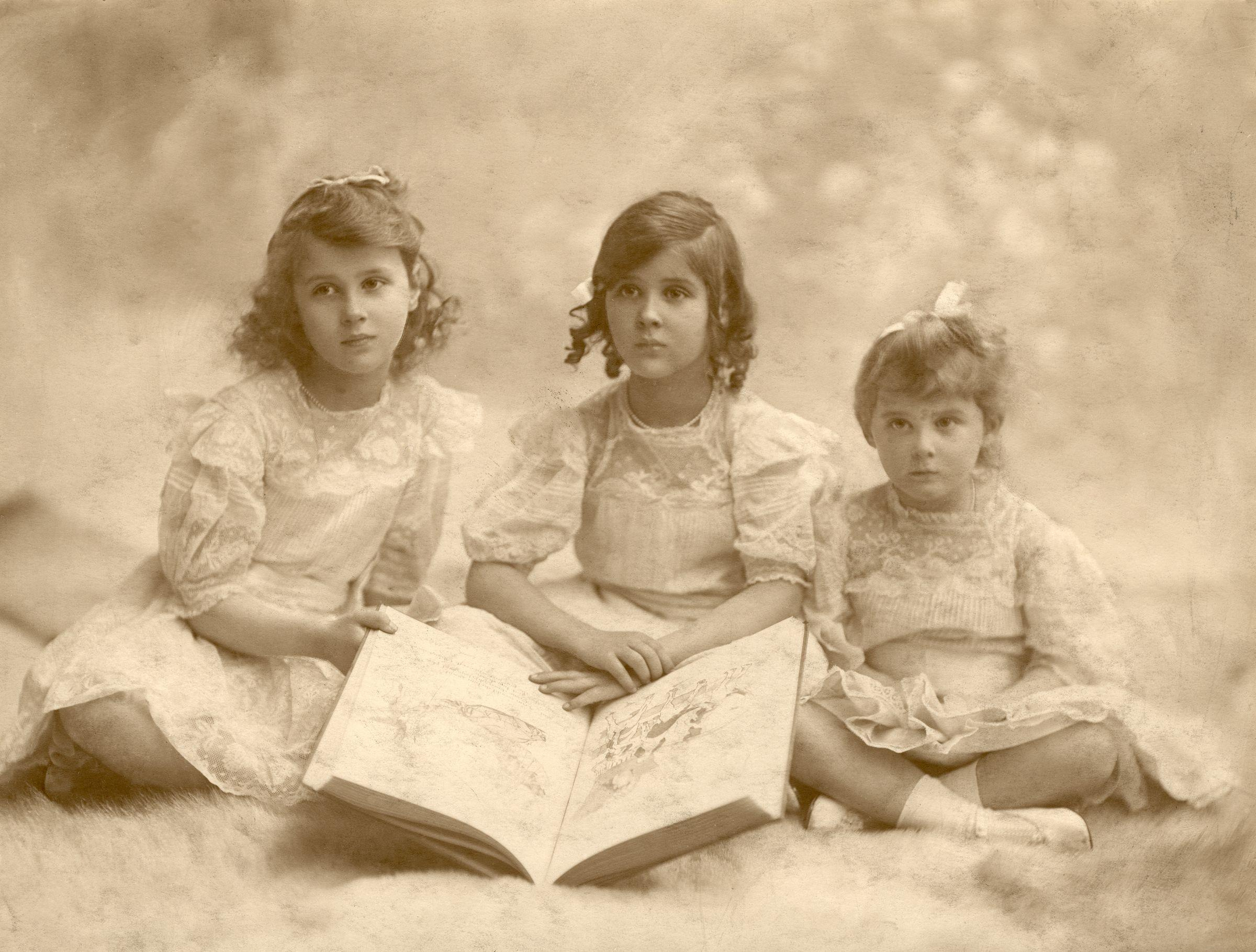
Princess Elizabeth surrounded by her sisters Olga and Marina (1912)

Elizabeth's early childhood was also marked by the series of upheavals that shook Greece from 1909. That year, a military coup, known as the Goudi coup, forced the sons of King George I, including Prince Nicholas, to resign from the Army. Shortly after, Eleftherios Venizelos, a Cretan politician known for his distrust of the royal family, took over as head of government. Under his leadership, Greece engaged in the Balkan Wars of 1912–1913, which allowed it to considerably expand its territory at the expense of the Ottoman Empire. However, King George I was assassinated during the conflict, causing great grief to Elizabeth and her sisters.

At the same time, Kate Fox was sidelined and the education of the three girls took a new turn. Entrusted to the care of two tutors, a Frenchwoman named Miss Perrin and a Greek woman named Kyria Anna, the princesses received lessons in French literature, German and gymnastics while their religious instruction was reinforced in preparation for their first communion. With her sister Olga, Elizabeth also took riding lessons and soon became a skilled rider, which distinguished her from her elder sister. Initially, these lessons were held in the gardens of the royal palace and the little girls learned to ride on ponies belonging to their cousins Prince Paul and Princess Irene. However, the deterioration of the relations between Queen Sophia and Grand Duchess Elena then led the little girls to train far from the royal palace.

==== First World War and the National Schism (1914–1917) ====
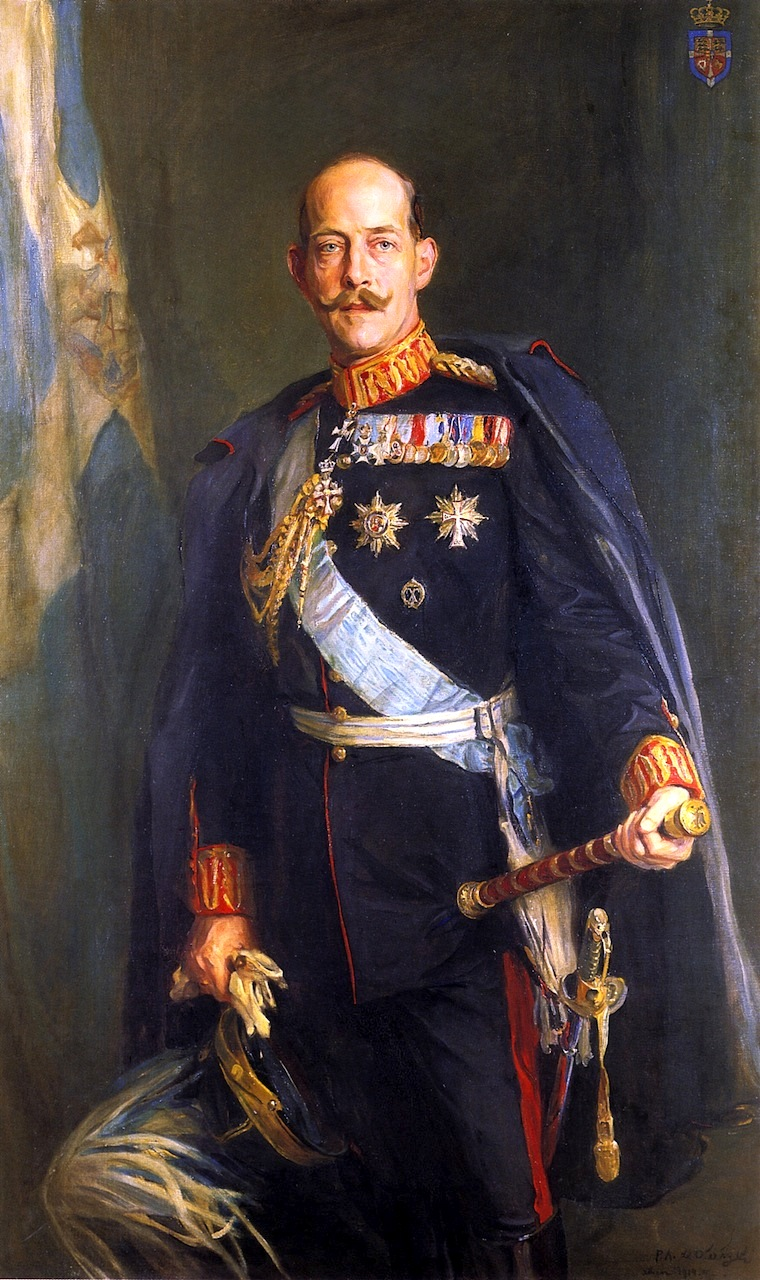
King Constantine I by Philip de László (1914)

Despite the assassination of Archduke Franz Ferdinand in Sarajevo and the tensions it caused in the Balkans, Elizabeth and her family undertook their annual visit to Russia in July 1914. Surprised by the outbreak of the First World War while they were in Saint Petersburg, the family returned hastily to Athens in September after crossing Romania and Serbia. This was the beginning of a difficult period, known as the National Schism, during which the Greek people were torn between Venizelists, who supported entering the war on the side of the Triple Entente, and royalists, who were keen to preserve the neutrality of the country, weakened by the Balkan Wars.

Even within the royal family, the question of participation in the global conflict was causing tensions, especially since Elizabeth's mother suspected Queen Sophia of supporting the cause of her brother, Kaiser Wilhelm II. In addition to these divisions, which led Elizabeth to see the daughters of King Constantine I less regularly, the war also brought its share of financial difficulties. Prince Nicholas's income depended very largely on his wife's appanage, and his household was heavily affected by the economic crisis that was raging in the Russian Empire. Long protected from fighting, the Hellenic capital was also hit by Allied fire in December 1916, forcing Elizabeth and her sisters to seek refuge in the cellars of the Nicholas Palace.

The family's situation worsened further in 1917. In February, a revolution overthrew the Tsarist regime, depriving Constantine I of the last of his supporters within the Entente. At the same time, concern grew over the fate of members of the former imperial family. Like many other Romanovs, Elizabeth's two grandmothers found themselves trapped in their palace, while several other relatives were arrested. (Note: This was, for example, the case of the grand dukes Paul Alexandrovich, paternal uncle of Elizabeth's mother, and George Mikhailovich of Russia, a first cousin of Elizabeth's paternal grandmother (Mateos Sáinz de Medrano 2004, p. 327, 335).) Finally, in June, the Entente forced Constantine I to abdicate in favor of his second son, Prince Alexander, and go into exile. Initially spared by the events, Prince Nicholas and his family were soon forced to abandon Greece in turn, which they did on 4 July.

==== Swiss exile and concern for the Romanovs (1917–1920) ====
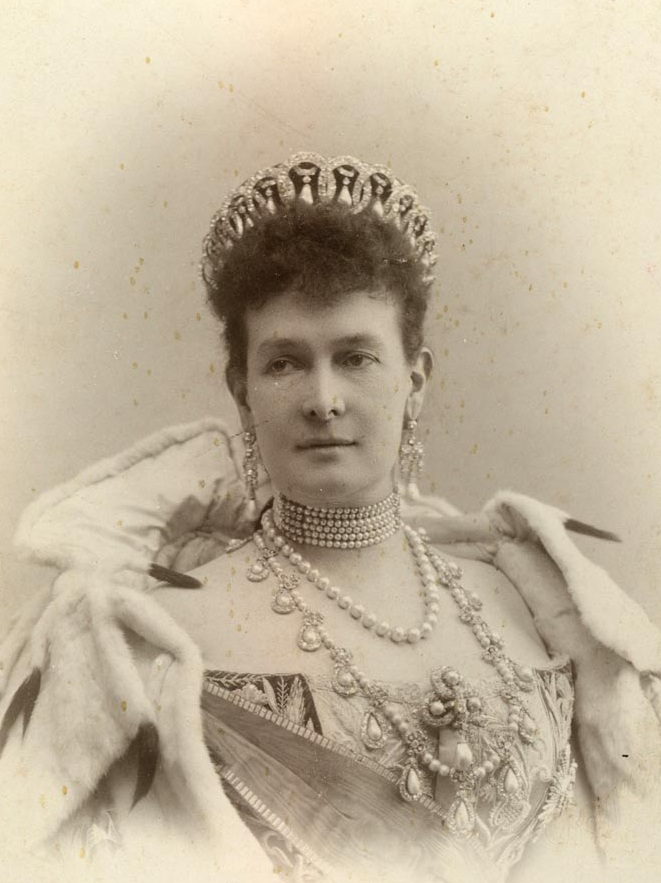
Grand Duchess Maria Pavlovna of Russia in 1908

In Switzerland, Elizabeth and her family led an itinerant life which took them successively to St. Moritz, Zurich, Ouchy, Villeneuve and Montreux. With Grand Duchess Elena's fortune having been confiscated by the Bolsheviks, the family was forced to dismiss some of its servants. As a cost-saving measure, Elizabeth also had to share a room with her sisters for the first time in her life. Due to war-related coal and hot water shortages, she was also forced to limit herself to one bath per week. For a time, the princess and her sisters attended a school in Zurich, but their difficulties with German eventually forced their parents to resort to home education, supervised by a trilingual tutor named Miss Genand.

The situation of their Russian relatives was another source of concern for Elizabeth and her family. While Prince Nicholas's family was relieved to find Queen Olga (in June–July 1918) safe and sound, and Grand Duchess Maria Pavlovna (in February 1920), the latter had been greatly weakened by deprivation, and she died only a few months after having managed to flee her country. Many other Romanovs were less fortunate, and the news of the assassination of the imperial family thus sowed consternation among the Greek exiles. The only consolation for the small group: the Vladimirovich branch (to which Grand Duchess Elena belonged) was entirely spared by the civil war and communist repression. Grand Duchess Maria Pavlovna also managed to save her jewels, which provided some support for Elizabeth's family.

Despite these concerns and the pettiness periodically suffered by the Greek exiles at the hands of the Entente and the Swiss authorities, exile was also a time of discovery for Elizabeth and her sisters. The princesses learned to ski and ice skate. They also received dance lessons and took part in their first tea dances. With her elder, Elizabeth also played tennis, a sport for which both sisters were passionate. Finally, the Swiss stay was also an opportunity for the teenagers to attend the wedding of their uncle Prince Christopher to a wealthy American woman named Nancy Stewart in January 1920.

=== Search for a husband (1920–1934) ===
==== End of exile (1920–1924) ====
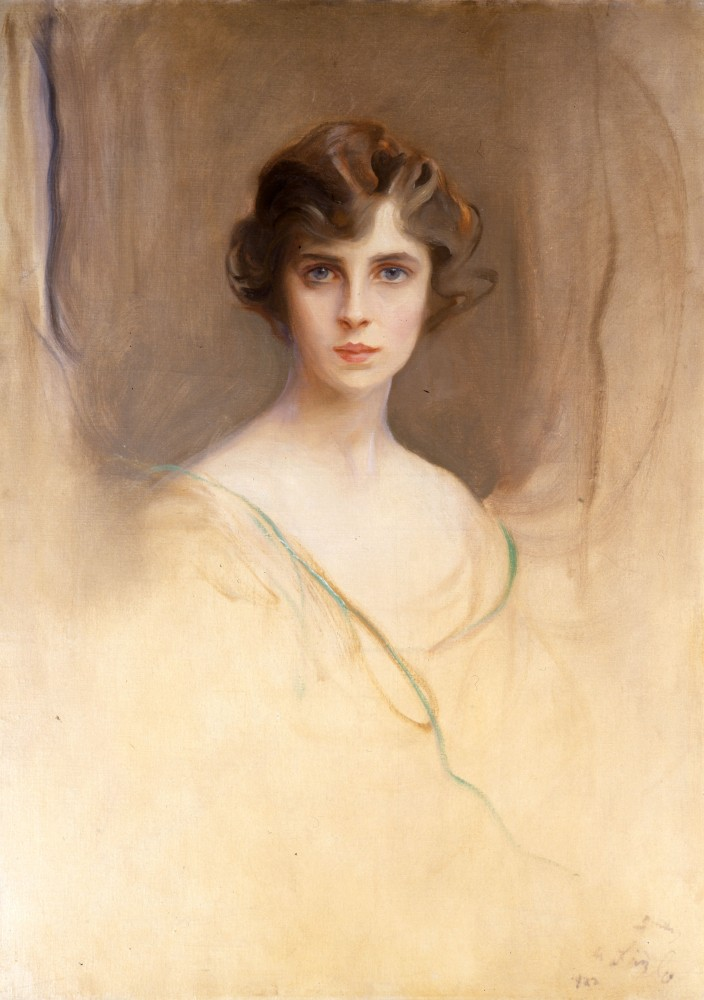
Princess Olga at the time of her aborted engagement, by Philip de László

On 25 October 1920, King Alexander died of sepsis after being bitten by a domestic monkey. This unexpected event provoked a political crisis in Athens, where Eleftherios Venizelos was already weakened by the war he had unleashed against Turkey. Defeated in the November elections, he was forced to abandon the government to the monarchists, who then organized a referendum to restore Constantine I to the throne. The ensuing royalist wave thus allowed members of the dynasty to return to Greece, which happened in December 1920. A few weeks after these events, Kate Fox resumed her position in Prince Nicholas's household, much to the delight of Elizabeth and her sisters.

Within the royal family, the end of exile was also the occasion for other celebrations, which led Elizabeth to travel to France, Romania and Greece. In February 1921, Crown Prince George married Princess Elisabeth of Romania in Bucharest. The following month, Princess Helen married Prince Carol of Romania in Athens. Finally, in November, the baptism of Prince Philip took place in Corfu. In March 1922, another union seemed to be taking shape with the engagement of Princess Olga and Crown Prince Frederik of Denmark.

The engagement had barely been made public when it was cancelled by the heir to the Danish throne, who also made the mistake of disclosing his decision to Elizabeth before even speaking to Olga, placing the princess in a very uncomfortable position with her elder sister. However, the prince had already committed another faux pas involving Elizabeth some time before: (Note: Interestingly, the biographies of Olga and her husband written by Neil Balfour and Robert Prendice do not mention this anecdote.) during the official presentation of the young couple to the Athenian crowd, Frederik took Elizabeth's hand instead of Olga's, thus humiliating his bride.

Added to this rupture was another misfortune, the consequences of which were far more serious for Elizabeth and her family. With Greece's military situation in Asia Minor, which was deteriorating with Turkey, a coup d'état took place in the Hellenic kingdom, forcing Constantine I to abdicate in favor of the Diadochos on 27 September 1922. In the following weeks, a purge hit the Greek state and Prince Andrew was arrested. Narrowly saved by the intervention of foreign powers, he nevertheless had to go into exile, something to which Prince Nicholas also resolved. Reduced to the status of a puppet king, George II himself was eventually forced to abandon Greece, and the republic was proclaimed on 25 March 1924, depriving Elizabeth and her relatives of their Greek nationality. (Note: In exile, members of the Greek royal family received Danish passports from their cousin King Christian X (Van der Kiste 1994, p. 144).)

==== Itinerant life (1922–1933) ====
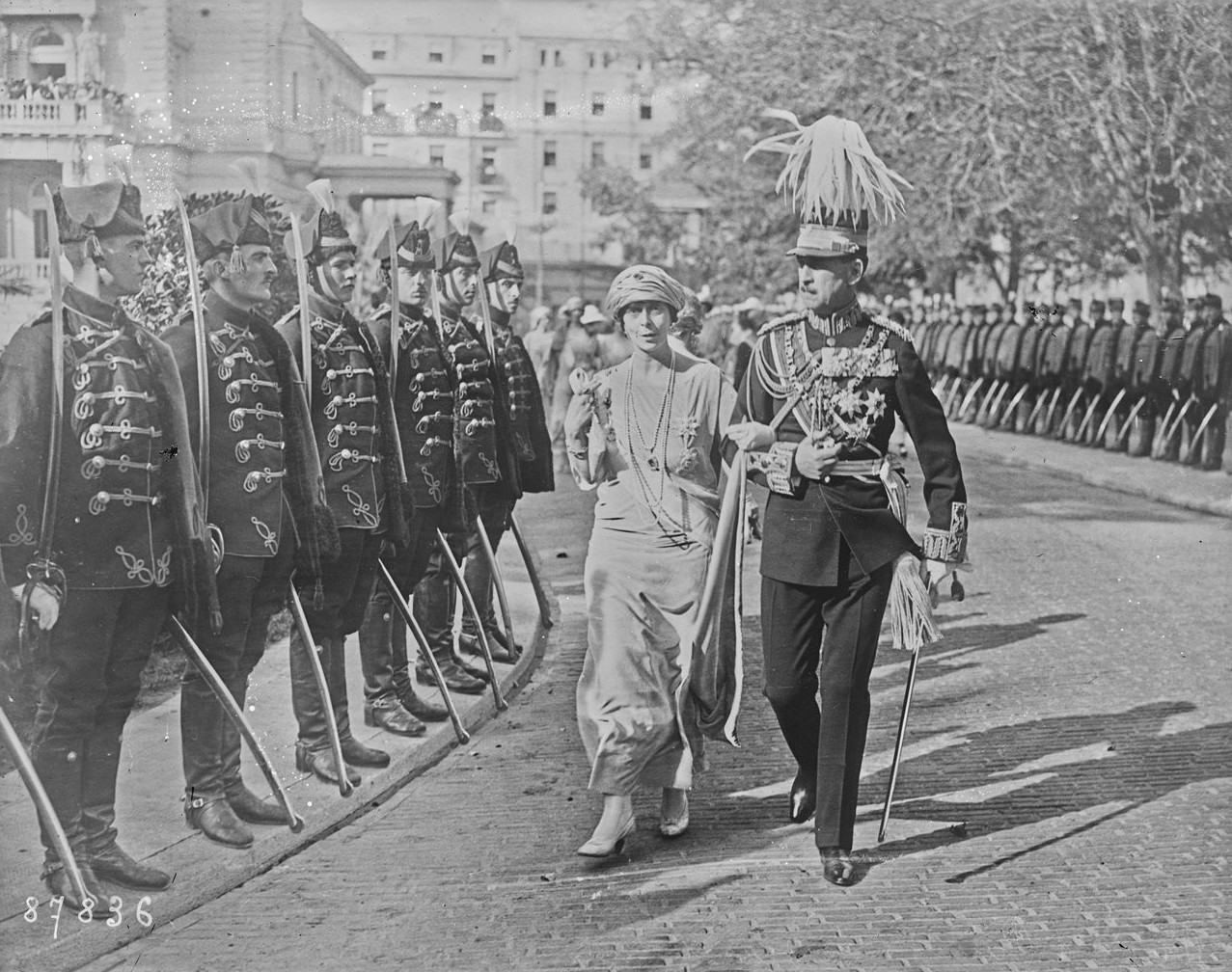
Grand Duchess Elena and Prince Nicholas at the wedding of their daughter Olga in Belgrade (1923)

When King Constantine I abdicated, Elizabeth was in Paris with her mother and sisters. Once reassured about the fate of her father, who was rumored to have been assassinated during the coup d'état, Elizabeth nevertheless left Paris with Kate Fox and Marina, for a vacation in Chamonix. The small group then headed to Sanremo, where the family gathered for the end-of-year celebrations. The reunion was short-lived, however, due to the death of the former king Constantine I on 11 January 1923 and the subsequent departure of the princess's parents to Palermo for the funeral. Despite the events, Elizabeth and Olga went to Grasse for the wedding of their friend Marie-Laure Bischoffsheim with Viscount Charles de Noailles. After that, Elizabeth went to Tyrol with Marina, where the two sisters had their adenoids removed.

As their exile dragged on, Prince Nicholas and his family established their residence in Paris. Encouraged by her father, Elizabeth then took drawing and painting lessons with Marina. She also supported her mother in the actions she led in favor of White Russian émigrés who had taken refuge in France. Prince Nicholas having managed to rent his Athenian palace, the family's financial situation improved and the small group moved to the United Kingdom, where Olga and Elizabeth made their debut in high society in June 1923. After being received by King George V and Queen Mary, the two sisters went from ball to ball, hoping to attract the attention of the Prince of Wales or one of his bachelor brothers, without any success. During an evening at Lady Zia Wernher's, Princess Olga nevertheless met Prince Paul of Serbia, who soon asked for her hand in marriage. Less fortunate than her elder sister, Elizabeth nevertheless had the satisfaction of going to Belgrade to attend the wedding on 22 October 1923.

In the years that followed, the princess led an itinerant life throughout Europe. In the summer of 1924, she was in London with Marina, where she continued to attend aristocratic balls. In September 1925, she travelled to Italy to attend the wedding of Princess Mafalda of Savoy to Prince Philip of Hesse-Kassel. In 1927, she spent several months in Slovenia and Serbia with her elder sister and brother-in-law, before visiting her cousin Helen in Romania. In 1929, she returned to Bucharest with Olga and her children. Finally, she returned to Slovenia and Germany during 1933. For her loved ones, who watched her age with anxiety, each of these trips was an opportunity to plan marriage. In addition to the future Edward VIII, attempts were made to match Elizabeth with Prince Umberto of Italy and Prince Nicholas of Romania. For a time, there was also hope that she would marry Lord Ivor Spencer-Churchill, though that plan did not come to fruition.

Penniless but renowned for her beauty, the princess then sold her image to the American cosmetics brand Pond's, which has belonged to Unilever since 1987. In the advertisements in which she appeared alongside her sister Marina, she was described as "as pretty as a fairy tale princess and possessing all the grace and dignity of her Greek heritage because she is charming, cheerful, versatile and very beautiful."

==== Engagement and marriage (1933–1934) ====
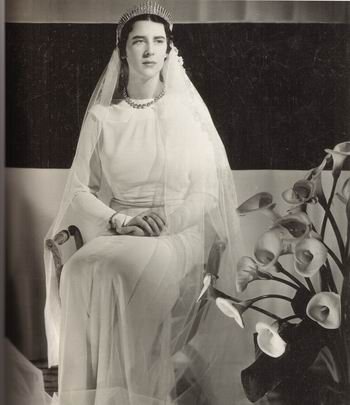
Princess Elizabeth at her wedding (1934)

In March 1933, Princess Elizabeth finally met Count Carl Theodor of Törring-Jettenbach during a trip to Munich with her sisters and brother-in-law Paul. Nicknamed "Toto", the Bavarian aristocrat was the head of the House of Törring-Jettenbach, whose territory was mediatised at the beginning of the 19th century. Nephew of Queen Elisabeth of the Belgians and first cousin of Prince Albrecht of Bavaria, he was at the head of a comfortable fortune and had an important collection of modern art.

Elizabeth and Carl Theodor quickly became friends and met several times, both in Bavaria and in Bohinj, Yugoslavia. However, the count initially showed only limited interest in the princess, much to the dismay of her family. On 21 September 1934, Carl Theodor nevertheless took advantage of a new stay in Bohinj to ask for Elizabeth's hand, which she accepted without hesitation. In the following weeks, she went to Munich to meet her future in-laws.

With Prince Nicholas still experiencing financial difficulties, his son-in-law Paul bought back some of Grand Duchess Elena's jewels to help her raise the money needed to put together Elizabeth's trousseau. Accompanied by Olga, she was able to go to Paris for her shopping, and chose a model by the couturier Jean Patou as her wedding dress.

The marriage of Elizabeth and Carl Theodor was finally celebrated on 10 January 1934 at Seefeld Castle, owned by the groom's brother. The ceremony, which took place according to Catholic rites, brought together several figures from the European royalty and nobility, including King George II of Greece, Crown Prince Umberto of Italy, Crown Prince Rupprecht of Bavaria, Infanta Beatrice of Spain, and General von Epp, Reichsstatthalter of Bavaria.

=== Countess of Törring-Jettenbach (1934–1955) ===
==== Relationship with family ====
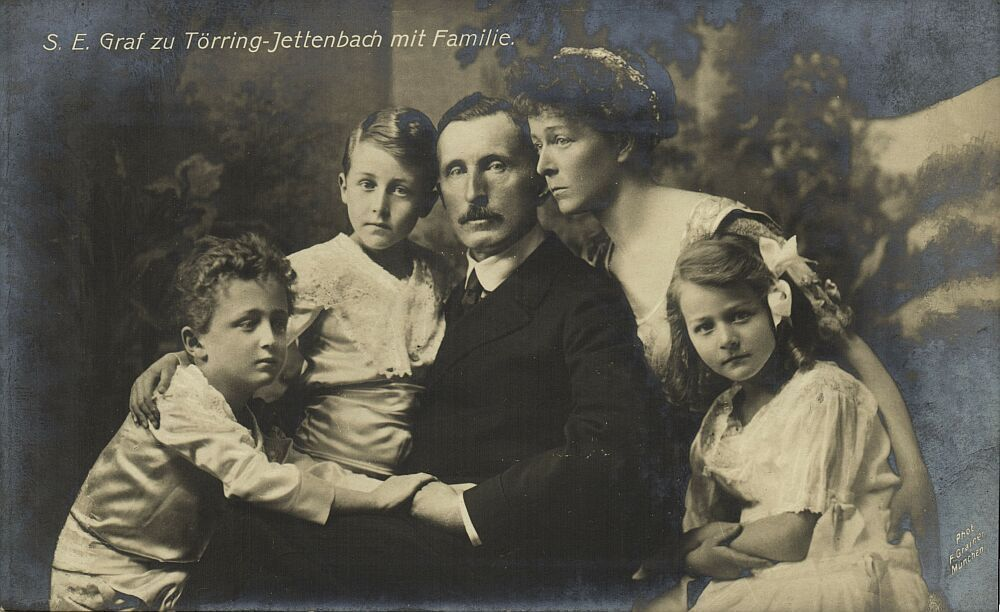
Carl Theodor of Törring-Jettenbach (second position) with his parents and siblings, around 1910

After their marriage, Elizabeth and Carl Theodor settled in Munich. The princess gave birth to a boy there, born just over a year after his parents' union, on 11 January 1935, and named Hans Veit after his late paternal grandfather. Two years later, a girl, born in Winhöring on 20 May 1937 and named Helene in honour of her maternal grandmother, joined the family after a difficult birth. A loving and caring mother, Elizabeth communicated with her children in English, a language she also used with her husband. Although she remained Orthodox until her death, the princess raised her offspring in the Catholic faith.

The arrival of the two children did not prevent Elizabeth and her husband from continuing to travel around Europe to meet their relatives. Princess Marina married the Duke of Kent in November 1934, and the Törrings made several trips to Great Britain. They also continued to frequently visit Princess Olga and Prince Paul in Yugoslavia. In 1935, the monarchy was restored in Greece and Elizabeth's parents decided to return to live in Athens. In 1937, Elizabeth returned to the country of her childhood on the occasion of the marriage of Crown Prince Paul to Princess Frederica of Hanover. The death of Prince Nicholas in 1938 led his daughter to return to Greece for his funeral. The princess subsequently made further visits there to help Grand Duchess Elena settle her affairs.

During these years, Elizabeth also regularly welcomed her relatives to Bavaria. In 1938, Princess Olga's 35th birthday was celebrated at the Törrings' house at Winhöring Castle. In her adopted country, Elizabeth was also in close contact with her cousins Margarita, Theodora, Cecilie, and Sophie, who had also married German princes.

==== Links with the Third Reich ====
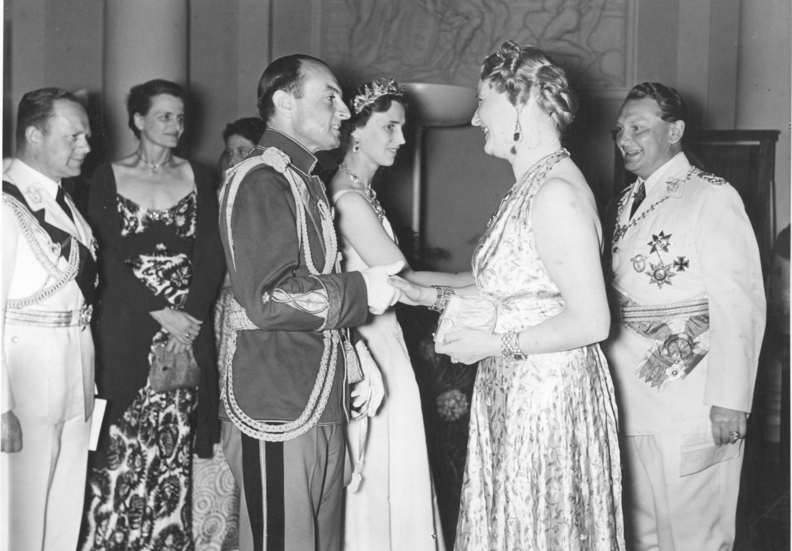
Prince Regent Paul of Yugoslavia and his wife Olga in front of Emmy and Hermann Göring (1939)

According to Count Hans Veit of Törring-Jettenbach, (Note: In Dear Ellen…, the Count explains: "Various authors and biographers, including my cousin Elizabeth's ex-husband, Balfour, have wrongly implied that my father was a Nazi. A biographer of my aunt Marina, Mrs. Watson, even said as much in her book. However, this could not be further from the truth. People like my father found themselves in a difficult position. As a Catholic, he would never have supported Hitler. As an aristocrat, he was banished and persecuted by the Nazis, especially after the Princes' Decree. Remember, his Bavarian royal cousins were also viciously persecuted by the Nazis and were even sent to concentration camps. No, my father lived in constant fear of being arrested at any moment, and I later wondered why we hadn't suffered the same fate as our Bavarian cousins." The Count added: "For my mother, the war was a very trying time indeed. […] She could not speak English outside the home and her opinions about the Nazis were strong." (Beéche 2012, p. 67-68).) his parents had no sympathy for Nazism. He justified this by saying that his family was Catholic, and therefore belonged to a community persecuted by Adolf Hitler, and that his father was excluded from the army by the "Princes' Decree" of 1940, which could only distance him from the Nazi regime. In fact, Elizabeth and her husband never joined the Nazi Party, unlike several of the princess's cousins. (Note: Princesses Cecilie and Margarita of Greece and Denmark, for example, joined the Nazi Party at the same time as their husbands, the Hereditary Grand Duke of Hesse and by Rhine and Prince Gottfried of Hohenlohe-Langenburg, in 1937 (Petropoulos 2009, p. 93-94, 136-137 et 382).) Furthermore, the communications of Elizabeth and Carl Theodor were closely monitored by the German authorities because of their connections with foreign powers. (Note: Count Hans Veit of Toerring-Jettenbach recounts: "I overheard an argument between my parents while we were in the car. Mother made some very harsh remarks about Hitler and the state of Germany, [and] my father sharply told her to beware of comments like that, saying, "If your opinion were expressed like that in public, Woolly, we'd be sent to the gas chamber." There were spies everywhere, and we had to be very careful. My mother liked to use English to communicate, but during the war, she could only use it with our father and us. If anyone had heard her speaking English in public, we would have been in serious trouble because there were spies everywhere, and every place was infiltrated by the Nazis and their supporters and collaborators." (Beéche 2011, p. 36-37).)

Nevertheless, the often heated discussions between the Törrings, on the one hand, and the Kents, the Yugoslavians and Grand Duchess Elena, on the other, show that at the end of the 1930s, Carl Theodor and Elizabeth readily supported the policies pursued by the Führer. Furthermore, in 1938, the Count fulfilled his military duty without flinching during the Anschluss and the invasion of the Sudetenland. As for Elizabeth, she actively helped her sister Olga organise the reception of Hermann Göring and his wife Emmy in Belgrade in 1935. Later, at the beginning of the Second World War, the princess took refuge in Yugoslavia with her children for a while, but it was only to escape rationing and not for political reasons that she left Germany.

According to historian Jonathan Petropoulos, a specialist in relations between the German elite and the Nazi regime, the Törrings' frequent visits to Yugoslavia and Great Britain during the 1930s certainly played a role in the Third Reich's diplomacy. It was therefore not insignificant that Elizabeth and her husband were invited to Berlin by the German authorities at the time of the official visit of Paul, Prince Regent of Yugoslavia, in June 1939. Similarly, the links between Count of Törring-Jettenbach and his brother-in-law the Duke of Kent were probably used by the Nazi regime to establish direct contact with the Windsors. However, the role of the Törrings in establishing a new European order should be put into perspective. As Jonathan Petropoulos wrote, "there have been indications that Count Törring and Philipp [of Hesse-Kassel] helped to sway Prince Paul to the German camp, but if so, they were merely pawns in a much larger equation."

==== Later years ====
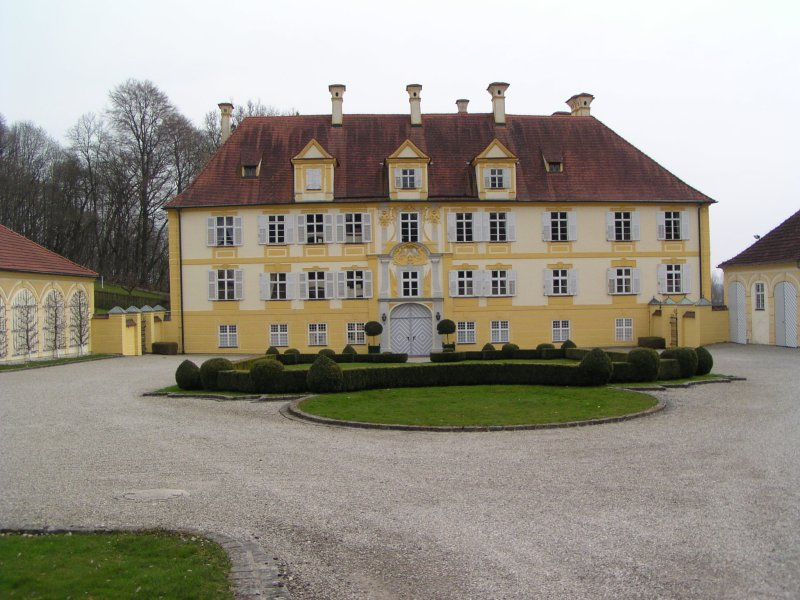
The Törring family castle in Winhöring (2003)

Cut off from her family after the invasion of Yugoslavia by the forces of the Third Reich in April 1941, Elizabeth emerged physically weakened from the Second World War. With the fall of the Third Reich and the Allied occupation of Germany, the princess was arrested and held overnight by the Americans. Instead of being interrogated, however, she was asked if she and her family were well, before being reassured about the fate of the rest of her loved ones.

In the years that followed, the Princess had the pleasure of reconnecting directly with her European relatives. In May 1947, Elizabeth was granted permission to visit her sister Marina in the United Kingdom. This was an opportunity for her to attend the 80th birthday celebrations of Queen Mary. Then, in June, Elizabeth went to Athens with Marina to meet Olga and their mother. However, the following November, Elizabeth was not invited to the wedding of her cousin Philip to Princess Elizabeth, the heir to the British throne. She had to be content to celebrate the event with the groom's sisters and other German relatives at Marienburg Castle. A few days later, however, she received a visit from Marina, who described the event in detail.

In November 1949, Elizabeth met her brother-in-law, Prince Paul, for the first time. In the eyes of the former regent of Yugoslavia, the Countess of Törring-Jettenbach appeared prematurely aged and diminished. In the years that followed, Elizabeth suffered from various health problems. In November 1950, she was hospitalised for several weeks in Switzerland for digestive problems and fatigue. In the autumn of 1952, she underwent surgery for a tumour in Athens. In December 1954, the princess was hospitalised again for an attack of arthritis and rheumatism. She died of cancer a few days later, on 11 January 1955 (Note: The princess died on her son's 20th birthday and the day after her 21st wedding anniversary (Beéche 2012, p. 68).) at the age of 50.

After a private ceremony, the princess was buried in the Törring mausoleum, adjacent to the chapel of the family castle in Winhöring.

== Honours ==
- Dame Grand Cross of the Order of Saints Olga and Sophia (Greece)

== Marriage and issue ==
On 9 and 10 January 1934, Elisabeth married Carl Theodor, Count of Toerring-Jettenbach (1900–1967), son of Count Hans Veit zu Toerring-Jettenbach (1862–1929) and Duchess Sophie in Bavaria (1875–1957), at Munich and Seefeld Castle. They had two children:

- Hans Veit, Count of Toerring-Jettenbach (born 1935), who married Princess Henriette of Hohenlohe-Bartenstein (born 1938) in 1964. They have three children:
  - Clarissa, Countess of Toerring-Jettenbach (born 1965), married Prince Tassilo of Hohenlohe-Schillingsfürst (born 1965);
  - Ignatius, Hereditary Count of Toerring-Jettenbach (born 1966), married Robiana Mentasti-Granelli (born 1976);
  - Karl, Count of Toerring-Jettenbach (born 1969), married Natasha Ivanova (born 1975) in 2009.
- Helene, Countess of Toerring-Jettenbach (born 1937), married Archduke Ferdinand of Austria (1918–2004) in 1956. They have three children:
  - Elisabeth, Archduchess of Austria (1957–1983), married James Litchfield (born 1956) in 1982;
  - Sophie, Archduchess of Austria (born 1959), married Prince Mariano Hugo of Windisch-Graetz (born 1955) in 1990;
  - Maximilian, Archduke of Austria (born 1961), married Sara Maya Al-Askari (born 1977) in 2005.

== Ancestry ==
Ancestors of Princess Elizabeth of Greece and Denmark

8. Christian IX of Denmark
4. George I of Greece
9. Princess Louise of Hesse-Kassel
2. Prince Nicholas of Greece and Denmark
10. Grand Duke Konstantin Nikolayevich of Russia
5. Grand Duchess Olga Constantinovna of Russia
11. Princess Alexandra of Saxe-Altenburg
1. Princess Elizabeth, Countess of Törring-Jettenbach
12. Alexander II of Russia
6. Grand Duke Vladimir Alexandrovich of Russia
13. Princess Marie of Hesse and by Rhine
3. Grand Duchess Elena Vladimirovna of Russia
14. Frederick Francis II, Grand Duke of Mecklenburg-Schwerin
7. Duchess Marie of Mecklenburg-Schwerin
15. Princess Augusta Reuss of Köstritz

== Bibliography ==
=== About Elizabeth ===
- Prince Nicholas of Greece (2006). Arturo E. Beéche (ed.). My Fifty Years. Eurohistory. ISBN 0977196135.
- Beéche, Arturo E. (June 2011). "So Happy: Woolly - Toto. Princess Elisabeth of Greece & Count Carl Theodor zu Toerring-Jettenbach". Eurohistory. The European Royal History Journal. 14.3 (LXXXI): 33–38.
- Miller, Ilana D. (2016). "Three Greek Beauties: The Daughters of Prince Nicholas of Greece". Eurohistory. The European Royal History Journal. 19.2 (CX): 18–28.
- Ilana D. Miller; Arturo E. Beéche. Royal Gatherings, Volume II: 1914-1939. Eurohistory. ISBN 9780985460389.
- Ricardo Mateos Sáinz de Medrano (2004). La Familia de la Reina Sofía: La Dinastía griega, la Casa de Hannover y los reales primos de Europa (in Spanish). Madrid: La Esfera de los Libros. pp. 263–265. ISBN 978-84-9734-195-0. 1.
- Παλαιολόγου, Αλκμήνη (2007). Πριγκίπισσες της Ελλάδος (in Greek). Athens: εκδόσεις Φερενίκη. pp. 199–202. ISBN 960-7952-47-2.

=== On Elizabeth's sisters and their husbands ===
- Balfour, Neil; Mackay, Sally (1980). Paul of Yugoslavia: Britain's maligned friend. H. Hamilton. ISBN 978-0-2411-0392-0.
- Prentice, Robert (2021). Princess Olga of Yugoslavia: Her Life and Times. Grosvenor House Publishing Ltd. ISBN 1839754427.
- Warwick, Christopher (2016). George and Marina: Duke and Duchess of Kent. Londres: Albert Bridge Books. ISBN 1909771155.
- Watson, Sophia (1994). Marina: The story of a Princess. Londres: Weidenfeld and Nicolson. ISBN 0297814672.

=== On the royal family of Greece in general ===
- Gould Lee, Arthur Stanley (1948). The Royal House of Greece. Ward Lock.
- Mateos Sáinz de Medrano, Ricardo (2004). La Familia de la Reina Sofía: La Dinastía griega, la Casa de Hannover y los reales primos de Europa (in Spanish). Madrid: La Esfera de los Libros. ISBN 978-84-9734-195-0.
- Van der Kiste, John (1994). Kings of the Hellenes: The Greek Kings, 1863-1974. Sutton Publishing. ISBN 0750921471.

=== Photographic albums dedicated to the royal family of Greece ===
- Beéche, Arturo E. (2012). Dear Ellen… Royal Europe Through the Photo Albums of Grand Duchess Helen Vladimirovna of Russia. pp. 62–70. ISBN 098546030X.
- Beéche, Arturo E.; Greece, Michael of; Hemis-Markesinis, Helen (2007). The Royal Hellenic dynasty. Eurohistory. ISBN 978-0-9771961-5-9.

=== Other works about royal families ===
- Heren, Louise (2016). British Nannies and the Great War: How Norland's Regiment of Nannies Coped With Conflict & Childcare in the Great War. Pen & Sword Books Ltd. ISBN 1473827531.
- Petropoulos, Jonathan (2009). Royals and the Reich: The Princes von Hessen in Nazi Germany. Oxford: Oxford University Press. ISBN 978-0-19-921278-1.
