= Children's Cancer and Blood Foundation =

US charity organization

Children's Cancer and Blood Foundation (CCBF) is a registered charity in the United States. Founded in 1952, CCBF is the first and largest charitable organization dedicated to supporting the care of children with cancer and blood diseases.
