= Prince Talal bin Muhammad =

Jordanian prince (born 1965)

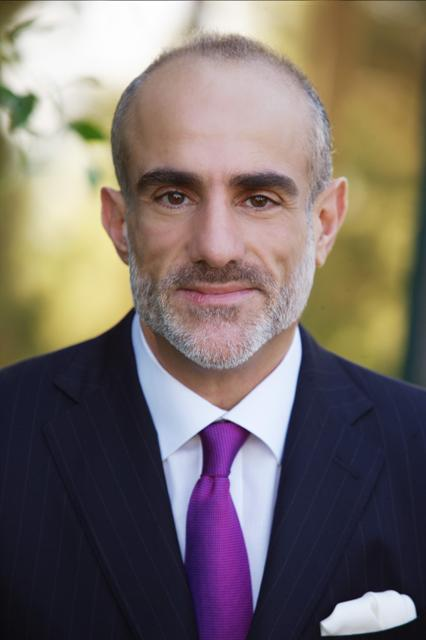
- Born: 26 July 1965 (age 61); Amman, Jordan
- Spouse: Ghida Sala'am (m. 1991)
- Issue: Prince Hussein; Princess Raja'a; Prince Muhammad
- House: Hashemite
- Father: Prince Muhammad bin Talal
- Mother: Firyal Irshaid
- Religion: Islam

Prince Talal bin Muhammad (born 26 July 1965) is a member of the Jordanian royal family. He is the eldest son of Prince Muhammad bin Talal, the younger brother of King Hussein of Jordan, and first cousin of the current King Abdullah; this makes him 15th in the line of succession to the Jordanian throne. He has one brother, Prince Ghazi (b. 1966).

== Biography ==
Prince Talal's early education took place in Jordan, and from 1975 to 1983 he attended Harrow School in the United Kingdom. In September 1983 he entered the Royal Military Academy Sandhurst in the United Kingdom, and upon passing in April 1984 was commissioned as a 2nd Lieutenant in the Jordan Arab Army. After a few months in the Jordanian Army, he entered the School of Foreign Service of Georgetown University, Washington DC in September 1984. He completed the five-year joint degree Bachelor of Science in Foreign Service – Master of Science in Foreign Service (BSFS-MSFS) program, concentrating in International Politics for his BS Degree and US Foreign Policy and Diplomacy for his MS Degree.

After undergoing further military training the US and the UK, Talal returned to the Jordanian Armed Forces, where he served as a Company Commander in a Special Forces battalion from March 1990 until March 1991. On 25 March 1991, he was appointed as Military Secretary to King Hussein. In this capacity he functioned as a personal aide to the King, taking the minutes of his meetings and accompanying him daily on his activities within Jordan and his official trips abroad. These duties expanded to charge of the King's political correspondence and speech writing – Prince Talal co-authored King Hussein's speech before a Joint Session of the US Congress marking the end of a State of War between Jordan and Israel in July 1994. Talal was further entrusted by King Hussein with intelligence liaison activities and confidential political missions.

In addition to this, Prince Talal was appointed by King Hussein as his Personal Representative in the United States in February 1992 – a position he held until the death of King Hussein in February 1999. This involved enhancing relations with the US Administration, Government and Congress following the Gulf War of 1991. Talal also advanced the King's official trips to the US, arranging his program and topics of discussion with US officials. He would then prepare his talking points, and remain behind in the US after each visit to follow up any outstanding issues. He was closely involved in securing the forgiveness of Jordan's $700 million debt to the US and the transfer of a squadron of F-16 fighter aircraft from the US to Jordan following the Washington Declaration of July 1994.

In August 1996, Prince Talal was appointed by King Hussein as Director of the National Security Council, with the task of establishing the National Security Council of Jordan. Amongst other things, he was responsible for the recruitment, training, and organization of the NSC Staff; the compilation of electronic data bases and Intelnet setup; coordination with the relevant government officials and bodies; intelligence liaison; producing and distributing a daily brief and in-depth studies; and compiling the Agenda for NSC meetings. Following the death of King Hussein, Prince Talal continued to hold this post until August 1999, when King Abdullah II appointed him as his National Security Advisor. He held this post until September 2001 when he was appointed Special Advisor to King Abdullah II.

== Personal life ==
In 1991, Prince Talal married Ghida Salaam, daughter of Hany Sala'am and Raja'a Arab. The couple live in Jordan with their three children: Prince Hussein (born 1999) and twins Princess Raja'a and Prince Muhammad (born 2001).

== Education ==
1975–1983 The Harrow School in Harrow, London, England.

1983–1984 The Royal Military Academy Sandhurst, UK. (Standard Military Course No.34)

1984–1989 Edmund A. Walsh School of Foreign Service, Washington DC, USA. Five-year Bachelor of Science in Foreign Service-Master of Science in Foreign Service Joint Degree program BSFS Concentration: International Politics, Law and Organization. MSFS Concentration: US Foreign Policy and Diplomacy

1975–1978 St Edmund's School, UK

1973–1975 American Community School, Amman

1972–1973 Orthodox College, Amman

== Career ==
- Sept. 2001 – present

Special Advisor to King Abdullah II

- Aug.1999-Sept.2001

National Security Advisor to King Abdullah II and Director of the National Security Council

- Aug.1996-Aug.1999

Director of the National Security Council

- Feb.1992-Feb.1999

Personal Representative of King Hussein in the United States of America

- Mar.1991-Aug.1996

Military Secretary of King Hussein

- Mar.1990-Mar.1991

Officer Commanding, 2nd Company, 91st SpecialForces Battalion, Khaw, Jordan

- Aug.1984-Mar.1990

Special Forces Brigade Headquarters

- May–Aug. 1984

Deputy A-Team Leader, 1st Company, 101st Special Forces Battalion, Hashemiyyah, Jordan

=== Other activities ===
- Sept. 2008 – present

Advisory Board Member, The James Martin 21st century School, Oxford University, UK

- Feb.2001– March 2002

Chairman of the National Landmine Removal and Rehabilitation Commission, Jordan

- Sept.1997 – present

Member of the Higher Committee of the Retired Servicemen and Veterans Association, Jordan

- Sept.1998-Sept.2001

Chairman of the Board of Trustees, Mutah University, Kerak, Jordan

- Sept.1998-Sept.2001

Member of the Committee of Higher Education, Jordan

== Honours ==
=== National honours ===
- Jordan : Grand Cordon of the Order of the Star of Jordan
- Jordan : Grand Cordon of the Order of Independence

=== Foreign honours ===
- Norway : Knight Grand Cross of the Royal Norwegian Order of Merit (4.4.2000)
- Spain : Knight Grand Cross of the Royal Order of Isabella the Catholic (2.12.1994)
- Sweden : Commander Grand Cross of the Order of the Polar Star (15.11.2022)

=== Appointments ===
==== Military promotions ====
- June 2009 Major-General
- June 2002 Brigadier-General
- May 1997 Colonel
- June 1994 Lieutenant-Colonel
- Nov.1992 Major
- Nov.1989 Captain
- Nov.1986 1st Lieutenant
- Apr. 1984 Commissioned 2nd Lieutenant

Royal titles
Preceded by Prince Muhammad bin Hashim	Line of succession to the Jordanian throne 14th position	Succeeded by Prince Hussein bin Talal
