= Winhöring =

- Municipality
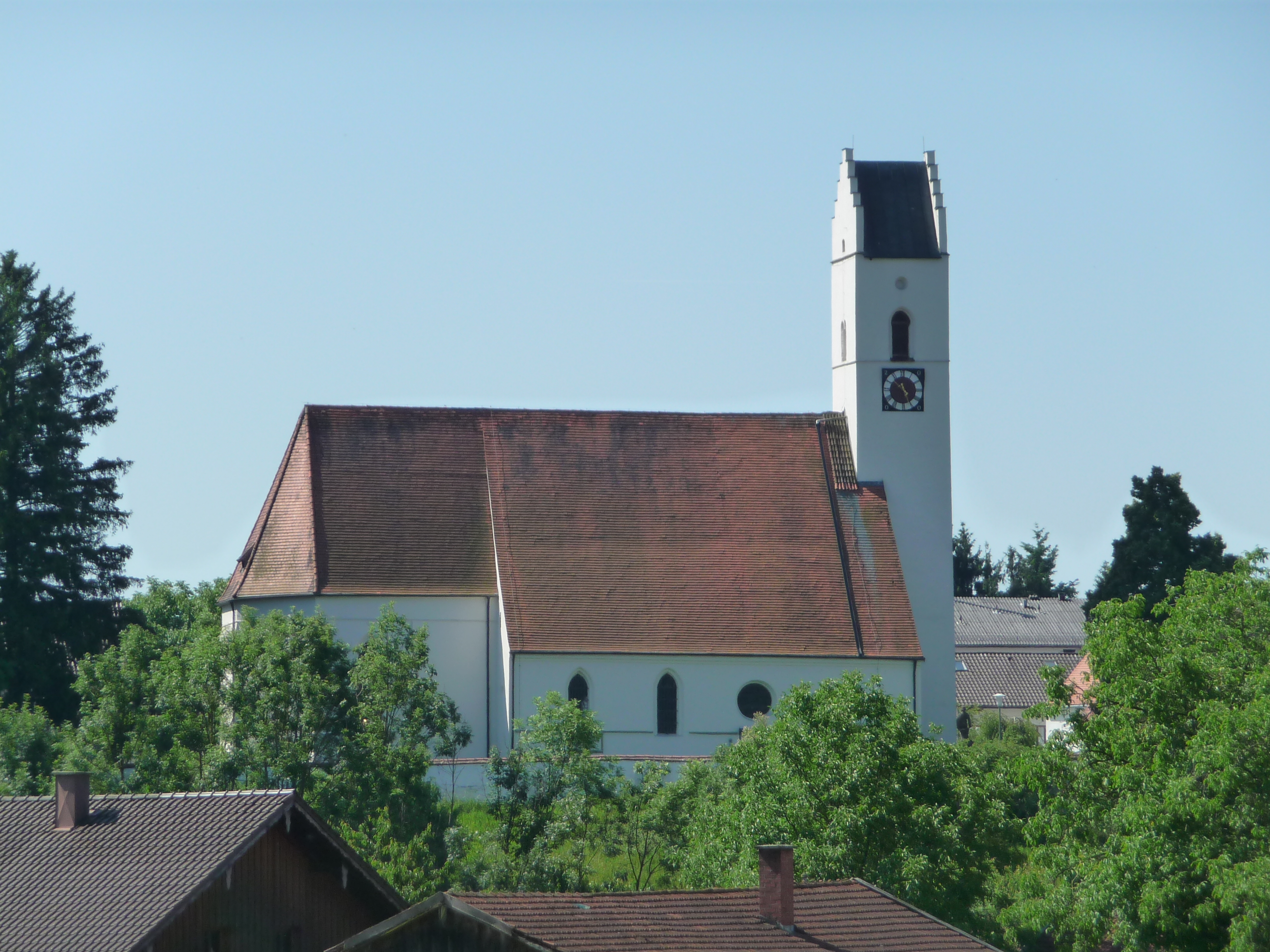
- Church of Saints Peter and Paul

- Coat of arms

- Location of Winhöring within Altötting district
- Interactive map of Winhöring
- Location within Germany Location within Bavaria
- Coordinates: 48°16′N 12°39′E
- Country: Germany
- State: Bavaria
- Admin. region: Oberbayern
- District: Altötting

Government
  - Mayor (2020–26): Karl Brandmüller (CSU)

Area
  - Total: 24.58 km^{2} (9.49 sq mi)
- Elevation: 374 m (1,227 ft)

Population (2025-12-31)
  - Total: 4,910
  - Density: 200/km^{2} (517/sq mi)
- Time zone: UTC+01:00 (CET)
  - Summer (DST): UTC+02:00 (CEST)
- Postal codes: 84543
- Dialling codes: 08671
- Vehicle registration: AÖ
- Website: www.winhoering.de

Winhöring (Central Bavarian: Winaring) is a municipality in the district of Altötting in Bavaria in Germany. The river Inn forms the municipality's southern border. The smaller river Isen flows through the municipality and then into the Inn.
