= Princess Ghida Talal =

Jordanian princess

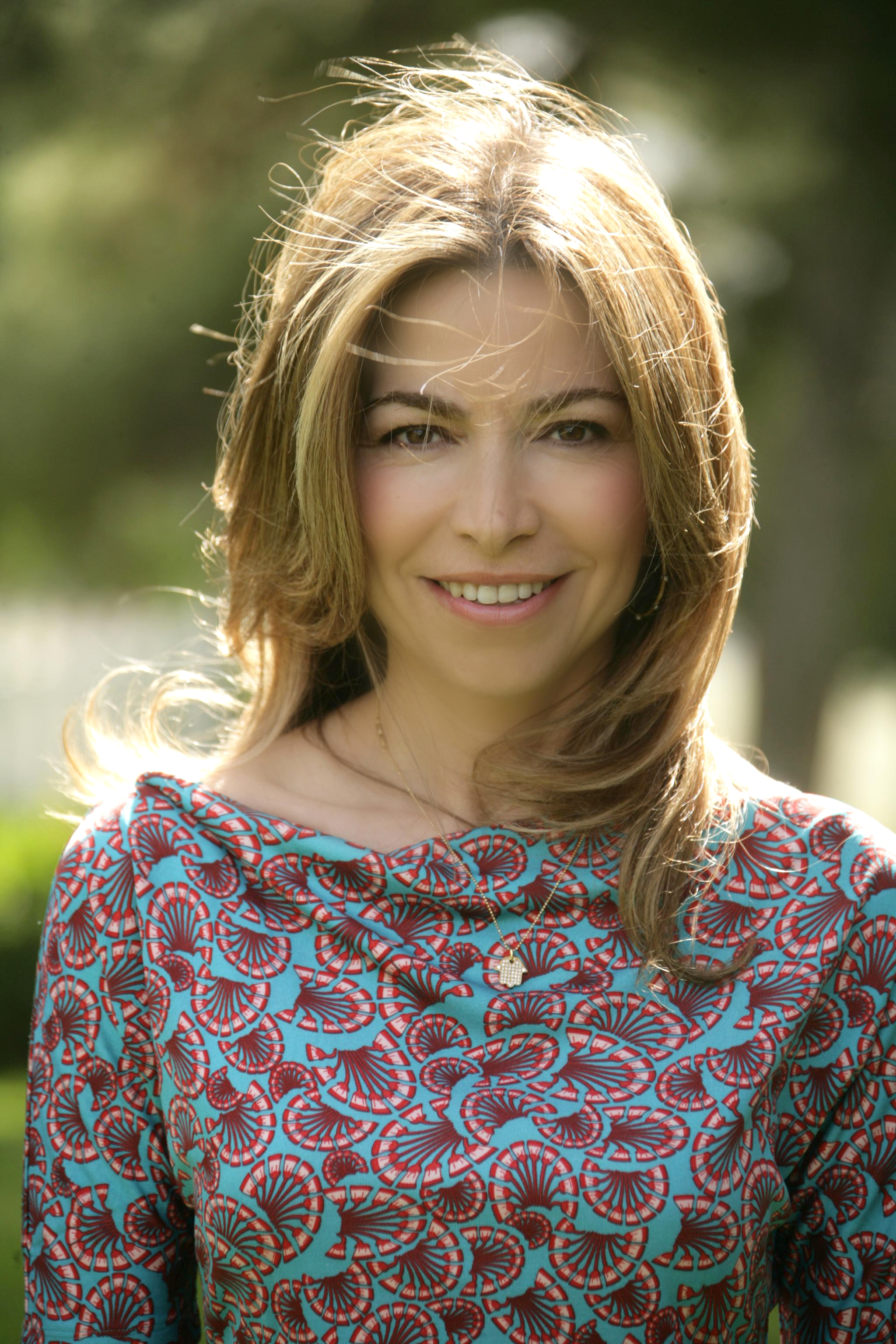
- Born: Ghida Salaam; 11 July 1963 (age 62); Beirut, Lebanon
- Spouse: Prince Talal bin Muhammad (m. 1991)
- Issue: Prince Hussein; Princess Raja'a; Prince Muhammad
- House: Hashemite (by marriage)
- Father: Hany Sala'am
- Mother: Raja'a Arab

Princess Ghida Talal (née Ghida Salaam; born 11 July 1963) is the chairperson of the board of trustees of the King Hussein Cancer Foundation and Center (KHCF) and (KHCC), based in Amman, Jordan. Born into a politically prominent family in Lebanon, Ghida is married to Prince Talal bin Muhammad of Jordan, the nephew of King Hussein bin Talal and 41st-generation direct descendant of the Islamic prophet Muhammad.

== Personal life and education ==
Ghida was born 11 July 1963 in Beirut, Lebanon, to Hany Salam and Raja'a Arab. She is the eldest of five children. The Salam family is a politically prominent family in Lebanon. Her great-grandfather, Salim Ali Salam, was a leading political figure in Beirut at the turn of the 20th century and held numerous public positions, including deputy from Beirut to the Ottoman Parliament. Her great-uncle Saeb Salam served as Prime Minister of Lebanon several times.

Ghida attended school in Beirut at the College Protestant Francais and graduated with the French and Lebanese baccalaureates. After finishing high school in Beirut, she began her college education in the United States. She graduated with a joint bachelor's and master's degree and magna cum laude honors in international politics and economics from Georgetown University's Edmund A. Walsh School of Foreign Service in Washington, D.C.

Ghida married Prince Talal bin Muhammad in 1991. The couple live in Jordan with their three children: Prince Hussein (born 1999) and twins Princess Raja'a and Prince Muhammad (born 2001).

== Career ==
After university, she began a career in journalism, starting with a job as a researcher for the American Broadcasting Company (ABC) News in London. She then moved to Argentina as a correspondent for the London-based Sunday Times newspaper. She then moved back to Beirut, where she covered Lebanese politics for Reuters. Her last work as a journalist was with the Financial Times of London.

Ghida moved to Jordan when she married Prince Talal Bin Muhammad in 1991. The late King Hussein asked her to establish the international press office of the Royal Hashemite Court, and she became the King's press secretary. In that capacity, she oversaw all press activities for the King and led a team of writers and press officers who covered the King's official activities. Ghida also directed research projects and produced many political and economic publications about Jordan. She served as press secretary until King Hussein's death in 1999.

In 2001, King Abdullah II appointed Ghida as full-time chairperson of the board of trustees of the King Hussein Cancer Foundation (KHCF).

Under Ghida's leadership, KHCF entered into agreements and partnerships with the University of Texas MD Anderson Cancer Center, National Cancer Institute (NCI) of the National Institutes of Health (NIH), St. Jude Children's Research Hospital, Georgetown University's Lombardi Cancer Center and Susan G. Komen for the Cure.

In 2007, she played a vital role in the Iraq Scholar Rescue Project, an Institute of International Education (IIE), which aimed to rescue scholars from Iraq who were being persecuted. Ghida helped find them safe havens at host universities across Europe, the U.S. and the Middle East, in particular Jordan, until they were able to safely return to their home country. She was awarded the IIE's Humanitarian Award for International Cooperation in 2008.

In 2011 King Abdullah II appointed Ghida to represent Jordan as his special envoy at the United Nations General Assembly's meeting on non-communicable diseases (NCDs) in New York.

=== Board memberships ===
- From 1997: National Swimming Federation, Jordan honorary chairperson
- 2003–2009: Georgetown University, board of regents
- From 2005: National Gallery of Fine Arts, Jordan
- From 2007: Institute of International Education, Scholar Rescue Fund
- From 2011: Georgetown University, board of directors
- From 2013: Institute of International Education, board member

== Honours ==
=== National ===
- 1995: Dame Grand Cordon of the Order of Independence
- 2006: Dame Grand Cordon of the Order of the Star of Jordan
- 2007: CCBF Breakthrough Spirit Award, presented by the Children's Cancer and Blood Foundation, N.Y.
- 2008: Humanitarian Award, presented by the Institute of International Education
- 2012: Independence Medal of the First Order, presented by HM King Abdullah II in recognition of the work accomplished by the King Hussein Cancer Foundation and Center
- 2022: Grand Cordon of the Order of the State Centennial

=== Foreign ===
- Lebanon: Officer of the Order of Merit
- Norway: Dame Grand Cross of the Order of Merit
- Spain: Dame Grand Cross of the Order of Isabella the Catholic
- Sweden: Member Grand Cross of the Order of the Polar Star

=== Academic awards ===
- 1967–1981: Prix d’Excellence, College Protestant Francais, Beirut
- 1981–1986: Award for Academic Excellence. Five years on Dean's honors list, Georgetown University
