= Mariano Hugo, Prince of Windisch-Graetz =

Head of the Austrian House of Windisch-Graetz

Mariano Hugo
- Prince of Windisch-Graetz
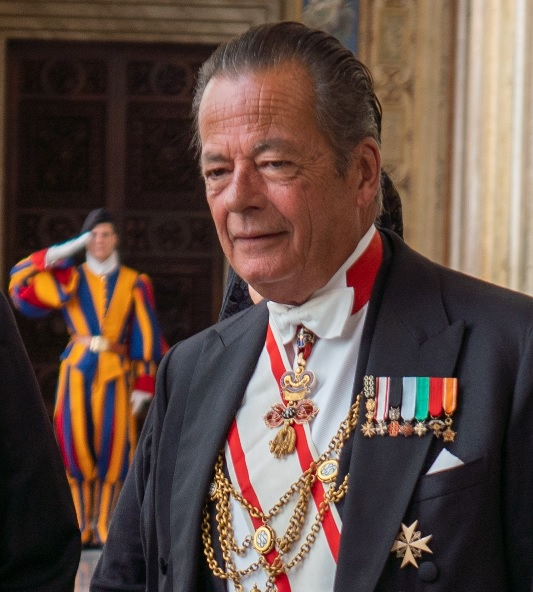

Head of the House of Windisch-Graetz
- Tenure: 1976 – present
- Predecessor: Prince Maximilian Antonius
- Heir apparent: Prince Maximilian Hugo
- Born: 27 July 1955 (age 70); Trieste, Italy
- Spouse: Archduchess Sophie of Austria (m. 1990)
- Issue: 3
- House: Windisch-Graetz
- Father: Prince Maximilian Antonius
- Mother: Donna Maria Luisa Serra di Gerace
- Religion: Roman Catholic
- Occupation: Ambassador

Styles of The Prince of Windisch-Graetz
- Reference style: His Serene Highness
- Spoken style: Your Serene Highness

Mariano Hugo, Prince of Windisch-Graetz (German: Mariano Hugo, Fürst zu Windisch-Graetz, Italian: Mariano Ugo, Principe di Windisch-Graetz; born 27 July 1955) is the current head of the Austrian House of Windisch-Graetz. He is currently a member of the Grand Magisterium of the Equestrian Order of the Holy Sepulchre of Jerusalem. A former ambassador of the Sovereign Military Order of Malta to Slovakia, he is also currently the Order's ambassador to Slovenia. He also sits on the council of the Dynastic orders of knighthood for the Royal House of Savoy.

== Upbringing and family ==
Windisch-Graetz was born at Trieste as the elder son of Maximilian Antonius, Prince of Windisch-Graetz and Donna Maria Luisa "Marilise" Serra di Gerace. His mother was the legitimatised daughter of Gian Battista Serra, 12th Prince of Gerace and Donna Maria Grazia Carafa d'Andria . He has two sisters and one brother: Christiana "Irma" married to Don Augusto Ruffo di Calabria (nephew of Queen Paola of Belgium), Maximiliane married with Prince Heinrich zu Fürstenberg and Manfred married with Maria Vittoria Lepri di Rota.

Windisch-Graetz was educated in Rome at the school of the De La Salle Brothers. In 1975 he graduated from University College of Buckingham with a degree in Philosophy, Economics and Political Science.

When his father died in 1976, Windisch-Graetz succeeded as head of a cadet branch of the House of Windisch-Graetz, a mediatised house whose members historically bore the style of "Serene Highness".

On 11 February 1990 in Salzburg, Austria, Windisch-Graetz married Archduchess Sophie of Austria, daughter of Archduke Ferdinand Karl Max of Austria and Countess Helene zu Toerring-Jettenbach, daughter of Princess Elizabeth of Greece and Denmark. The couple have had two sons and one daughter.

Windisch-Graetz and his family reside in Italy when he is not abroad on a diplomatic appointment, maintaining a home in Rome and another in Sant'Angelo d'Alife.

== Activities and appointments ==
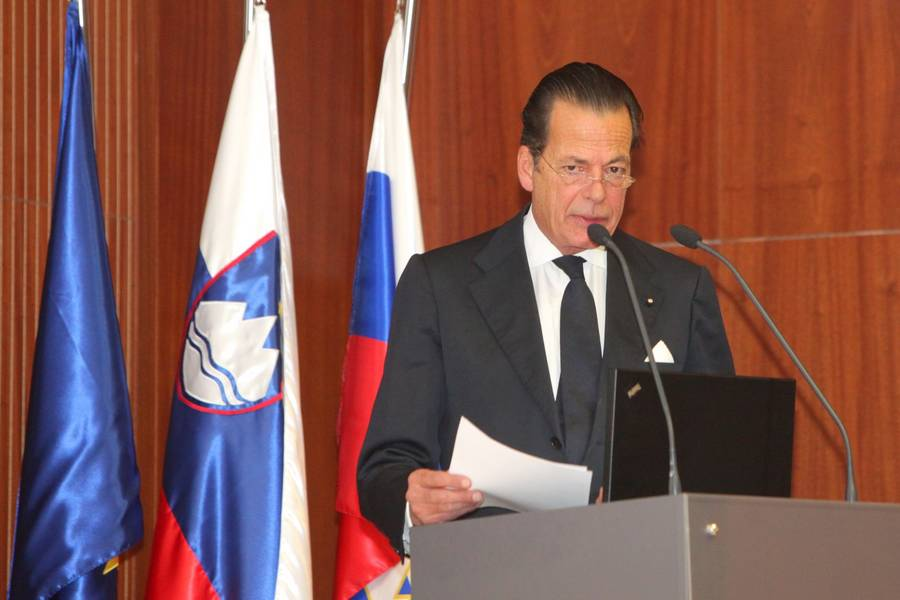
Ambassador Mariano Hugo of Windisch-Graetz gives a speech.

The business activities of Windisch-Graetz include the food production industry, notably biscuits and mozzarella cheese, and entrepreneurial finance. In the early 1990s, he was a major shareholder in the Banco di Napoli and a holding company, Sogesco, of which he owned 82%, was capitalised at 10 billion lire.

On 19 December 1987, Pope John Paul II appointed Windisch-Graetz a Gentleman of His Holiness, a role which entails meeting visiting heads of state and ambassadors and escorting them to meet the pope. He is also a Bailiff Grand Cross of Honour and Devotion in Obedience of the Sovereign Military Order of Malta of the Sovereign Military Order of Malta.

In 2003, Windisch-Graetz was appointed Ambassador of the Sovereign Military Order of Malta to the Republic of Slovakia; this appointment was renewed in 2006, until December 2009. In March 2009, he was appointed Ambassador of the Sovereign Military Order of Malta to the Republic of Slovenia.

On 9 June 2021, Windisch-Graetz was appointed to the Grand Magisterium of the Equestrian Order of the Holy Sepulchre of Jerusalem by the Grand Master of the Order, Fernando Cardinal Filoni. Windisch-Graetz has been a Knight Grand Officer of the Order since 1980.

== Honours and awards ==
- SMOM:
  - Bailiff Grand Cross of Honour and Devotion in Obedience of the Sovereign Military Order of Malta
  - Grand Cross of the Order pro Merito Melitensi
- Holy See: Grand Officer of the Order of the Holy Sepulchre
- Morocco: Grand Officer of the Order of Ouissam Alaouite
- House of Habsburg-Lorraine: Knight of the Austrian Order of the Golden Fleece
- House of Bourbon-Two Sicilies: Knight of Gr.Cr. of Justice of the Sacred Military Constantinian Order of Saint George
- House of Braganza: Grand Officer of the Order of Saint Michael of the Wing
- House of Petrović-Njegoš: Knight Commander of the Order of Prince Danilo I
- House of Savoy:
  - Knight of the Supreme Order of the Most Holy Annunciation
  - Knight Grand Cordon of the Order of Saints Maurice and Lazarus
  - Knight Grand Cross of the Order of Merit of Savoy
