= Sophie Habsburg =

Austrian princess (born 1959)

Archduchess Sophie
- Princess of Windisch-Graetz
- Born: 19 January 1959 (age 67); Boulogne-sur-Seine, Paris, France
- Spouse: Mariano Hugo, Prince of Windisch-Graetz (m. 1990)
- Issue: 3
- House: Habsburg-Lorraine
- Father: Archduke Ferdinand Karl of Austria
- Mother: Countess Helene zu Törring-Jettenbach
- Occupation: Model, journalist, handbag designer

Sophie Franziska Maria Germaine Habsburg also known as Archduchess Sophie of Austria (born 19 January 1959) is a French-born Italian designer, German aristocrat and former model.

== Career ==
Sophie Habsburg was born in Paris on 19 January 1959, the daughter of Archduke Ferdinand Karl Max of Austria and Countess Helene of Törring-Jettenbach. She descends from the House of Habsburg-Lorraine, which reigned over Austria-Hungary until its deposition in 1918. While studying interior design in her hometown, she worked as a model.

At the age of 20, Habsburg moved to Madrid and had a successful career in modelling. She appeared in De Beers and Valentino commercials, as well as on the cover of the first issue of Vogue Spain. At the same time she also designed jewellery and worked as decorator, radio host and journalist, interviewing royals and actors. She became friends with Richard Gere after an interview and raised funds with him for the charity SOS Children's Villages.

In 2010, Habsburg started designing handbags, known to some as Habsbags. Habsbags are often worn by members of the Spanish and British royal families.

== Ancestry ==
Through her maternal grandmother, Princess Elizabeth of Greece and Denmark, Sophie is a first cousin once removed of: Prince Edward, Duke of Kent, Princess Alexandra, The Honourable Lady Ogilvy, Prince Michael of Kent and Princess Elizabeth of Yugoslavia. Habsburg is a second cousin once removed of Queen Sofía of Spain and King Charles III, making Sophie a third cousin of Felipe VI of Spain and William, Prince of Wales. She is also a third cousin once removed of Margrethe II of Denmark and Harald V of Norway; and a fourth cousin to Grand Duke Henri of Luxembourg and King Philippe of Belgium.

== Personal life ==
On 11 February 1990 in Salzburg, Sophie Habsburg married Mariano Hugo, Prince of Windisch-Graetz, member of the House of Windisch-Graetz. They had three children, one of whom, Alexis Ferdinand, died in a car accident in 2010.
