= Deaths in November 1982 =

The following is a list of notable deaths in November 1982.

Entries for each day are listed alphabetically by surname. A typical entry lists information in the following sequence:

- Name, age, country of citizenship at birth, subsequent country of citizenship (if applicable), reason for notability, cause of death (if known), and reference.

== November 1982 ==
=== 1 ===
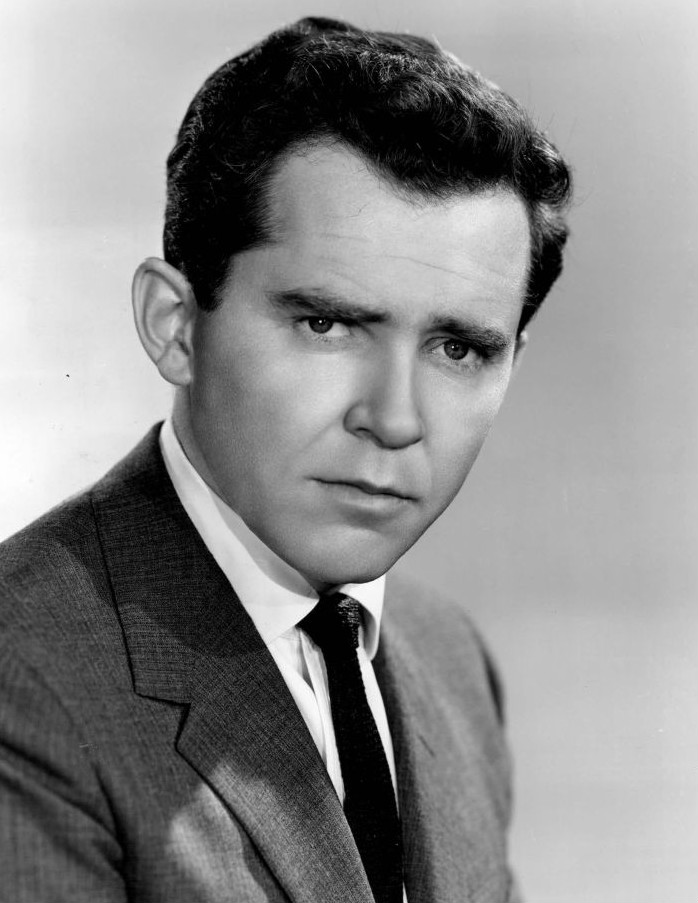
James Broderick

- James Broderick, 55, American actor, thyroid cancer
- King Vidor, 88, American film director, film producer, and screenwriter, heart attack

=== 2 ===
- Lester Roloff, 68, American Independent Baptist preacher, plane crash.

=== 4 ===
- Dominique Dunne, 22, American actress, removed from life support with the consent of her parents. Dunne was comatose and hospitalized since late October, when she was attacked and strangled by her ex-boyfriend

=== 5 ===
- Shabab Kiranvi, 56-57, Pakistani film director, producer, screenwriter, lyricist, novelist, and journalist
- Jacques Tati, 75, French mime, filmmaker, actor and screenwriter, he both created and played the character Monsieur Hulot

=== 7 ===
- John Bay, 53, American actor and playwright

=== 8 ===
- Marco de Gastyne, 93, French painter, illustrator and film director

=== 10 ===
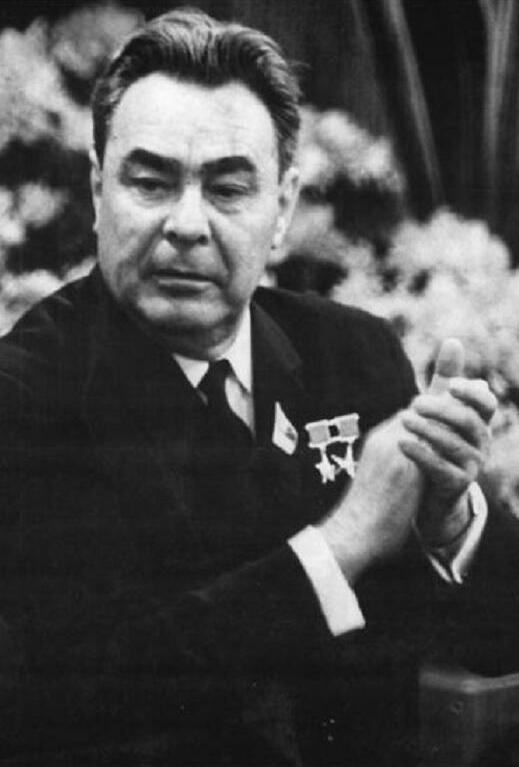
Leonid Brezhnev

- Leonid Brezhnev, 75, Soviet politician, he served as the General Secretary of the Communist Party of the Soviet Union from 1964 until his death in 1982, and was a part of the country's collective leadership, he also served as the head of state of the Soviet Union from 1960 until 1964, and again from 1977 until 1982, under the title of the chairman of the Presidium of the Supreme Soviet, heart attack
- Elio Petri, 53, Italian film and theatre director, screenwriter, satirist, and film critic, cancer
- Helen Sharsmith, 77, American botanist and educator, Parkinson's disease

=== 12 ===
- Patrick Cowley, 32, American composer and recording artist, primarily known for disco and hi-NRG dance music, credited as a pioneer of electronic dance music,death due to HIV/AIDS infection, misdiagnosed as food poisoning by his doctor and left untreated
- Dorothy Round, 73, British tennis player, professional coach, and sportswriter,

=== 13 ===
- Chesney Allen, 88, English comedian and musician, part of the comedy duo Flanagan and Allen

=== 15 ===
- Vinoba Bhave, 87, Indian philosopher and translator, advocate of nonviolence and human rights, death by intentional self-starvation (sallekhana) for religious reasons
- Dick Randall, 76, Australian senior public servant, he served as the Secretary of the Department of the Treasury from 1966 until 1971
- Allen Woodring, 84, American sprint runner and salesman for Sears, Roebuck & Co., winner of a gold metal in the 200 m event in the 1920 Summer Olympics

=== 16 ===
- Arthur Askey, 82, English comedian and actor, he rose to fame in 1938 through his role in the first regular radio comedy series, Band Waggon on the BBC, complications from gangrene

=== 17 ===
- Ruth Donnelly, 86, American actress

=== 18 ===
- Hilton Edwards, 79, English-born Irish actor, lighting designer, and theatrical producer, co-founder of the Gate Theatre in Dublin, credited as one of the founders of the Irish theatre.
- Kim Duk-koo, 27, South Korean professional boxer, competitor in the Lightweight division, left comatose with a subdural hematoma consisting of 100 cubic centimetres (100 ml) of blood in his skull following his last boxing match, he died in a hospital five days after the bout
- William P. McGivern, 63, American novelist and television scriptwriter, specialized in writing mystery fiction and crime thrillers

=== 19 ===
- Ernesto Colli, 42, Italian actor
- Erving Goffman, 60, Canadian-born American sociologist, social psychologist, and writer, listed posthumously in the late 2000s as the sixth most-cited author of books in the humanities and social sciences,stomach cancer
- Toña la Negra, 70, Mexican singer and actress, primarily known for her interpretation of boleros and canciones, heart attack while already hospitalized due to suffering from a cardiovascular disease

=== 21 ===
- Barry Alldis, 51, Australian radio presenter and announcer, primarily known for working on British radio and at Radio Luxembourg
- Anna Konstam, 68, British actress
- Lee Patrick, 80, American actress, heart seizure

=== 22 ===
- Jean Batten, 73, New Zealand aviator, who set a flight record in 1936 of eleven days, and 45 minutes to conclude a direct flight from England to New Zealand,, pulmonary abscess attributed to an infected wound from a dog bite
- Roy Hofheinz, 70, American businessman and politician, creator of the Houston Astrodome.

=== 23 ===
- Adoniran Barbosa, 72, Brazilian samba singer and composer

=== 24 ===
- Barack Obama Sr., 48, Kenyan economist, senior economist in the Kenyan Ministry of Finance, killed in a car crash

=== 25 ===
- Hugh Harman, 79, American animator, co-founder of the animation studios Warner Bros. Cartoons and MGM Cartoons, co-creator of the character Bosko and the theatrical animated series Looney Tunes, died due to an unspecified long-term illness

=== 26 ===
- Robert Coote, 73, English actor, he originated the role of Colonel Pickering in the original Broadway production of My Fair Lady, died in his sleep
- Dan Tobin, 72, American character actor

=== 27 ===
- Steve Gordon, 44, American screenwriter and film director, he both wrote and directed the comedy film Arthur (1981), heart attack

=== 28 ===
- Helen of Greece and Denmark, 86, princess of Greece and princess of Denmark since birth as the eldest daughter of Constantine I of Greece, queen mother of Romania from 1940 until 1947as the mother of the monarch Michael I of Romania, died in exile while living in Switzerland with her son

=== 29 ===
- Hermann Balck, 88, German military officer, reaching the rank of General der Panzertruppe, veteran of both world wars, convicted by the French authorities in the aftermath of World War II for his role in the scorched earth Operation Waldfest
- Percy Williams, 74, Canadian athlete, winner of the 100 and 200 metres races at the 1928 Summer Olympics and a former world record holder for the 100 metres sprint, gun collector, suicide by firearm, as he shot himself in the head with a shotgun

=== 30 ===
- Verna Fields, 64, American film editor, sound editor, film studio executive, and university educator, she served as the Feature-Production Vice-President of Universal Pictures from 1976 until 1982 and she was one of the first women to hold high executive positions within the major film studios, cancer
- Eric Thompson, 53, English actor, scriptwriter and stage director, he was both the main writer and the narrator of the animated television series The Magic Roundabout, heart attack

== Sources ==
- Brown, Archie (2009). The Rise & Fall of Communism. Bodley Head. ISBN 978-0061138799.
- Chubarov, Alexander (2003). Russia's Bitter Path to Modernity: A History of the Soviet and post-Soviet Eras. Continuum International Publishing Group. ISBN 978-0826413505.
- Dundas, Paul (2002) [1992], The Jains (Second ed.), London and New York City: Routledge, ISBN 0-415-26605-X
- Fine, Gary A.; Manning, Philip (2003), "Erving Goffman", in Ritzer, George (ed.), The Blackwell companion to major contemporary social theorists, Malden, Massachusetts Oxford: Blackwell, ISBN 978-1-4051-0595-8.
- Gould Lee, Arthur Stanley (1956), Helen, Queen Mother of Rumania, Princess of Greece and Denmark: An Authorized Biography, London: Faber and Faber
- Mackersey, Ian (2014) [1990]. Jean Batten: The Garbo of the Skies. Auckland: David Bateman. ISBN 978-1-86953-852-1.
- Marcou, Lilly (2002), Le Roi trahi : Carol II de Roumanie, Pygmalion ISBN 2857047436
- Durgnat, Raymond and Simmon, Scott. 1988. King Vidor, American. University of California Press, Berkeley. ISBN 0-520-05798-8
- Porter, Ivor (2005), Michael of Romania. The King and the Country, Phoenix Mill: Sutton Publishing
- Service, Robert (2009). History of Modern Russia: From Tsarism to the Twenty-first Century (3 ed.). Penguin Books Ltd. ISBN 978-0674034938. (online).
