= Bernhard Markgraf von Baden =

Bernhard
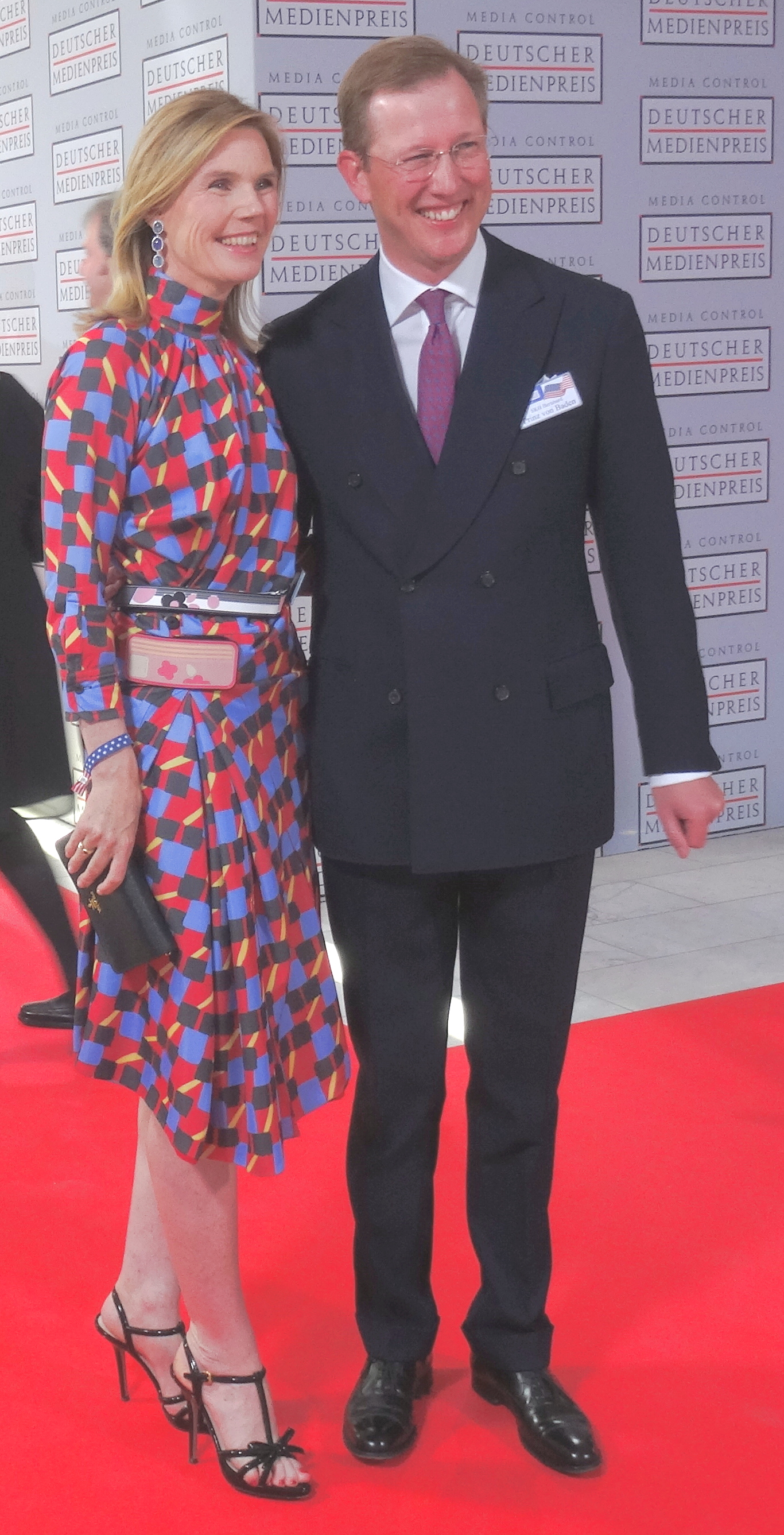
- Bernhard and his wife in 2017

Head of the House of Baden
- Tenure: 29 December 2022 – present
- Predecessor: Maximilian
- Heir apparent: Leopold
- Born: 27 May 1970 (age 56); Schloss Salem, Salem, Baden-Württemberg, West Germany
- Spouse: Stephanie Kaul (m. 2001)
- Issue: 3
Names
- Bernhard Max Friedrich August Gustav Ludwig Kraft
- House: Baden
- Father: Maximilian, Margrave of Baden
- Mother: Archduchess Valerie of Austria

Bernhard Prinz und Markgraf von Baden, Herzog von Zähringen (born 27 May 1970), styled Margrave of Baden, is the head of the House of Baden since 29 December 2022 following the death of his father, Maximilian. He is a first cousin once removed of King Charles III of the United Kingdom.

== Early life and family ==
Bernhard was born at Schloss Salem in Salem, Baden-Württemberg, on 27 May 1970. He is the eldest son of Maximilian, Margrave of Baden, and Archduchess Valerie of Austria (born 1941) and was styled as the heir of his father, Hereditary Prince of Baden.

His paternal grandparents were Berthold, Margrave of Baden, and Princess Theodora of Greece and Denmark, who was a sister of Prince Philip, Duke of Edinburgh. His maternal grandparents were Archduke Hubert Salvator of Austria and Princess Rosemary of Salm-Salm.

== Activities ==
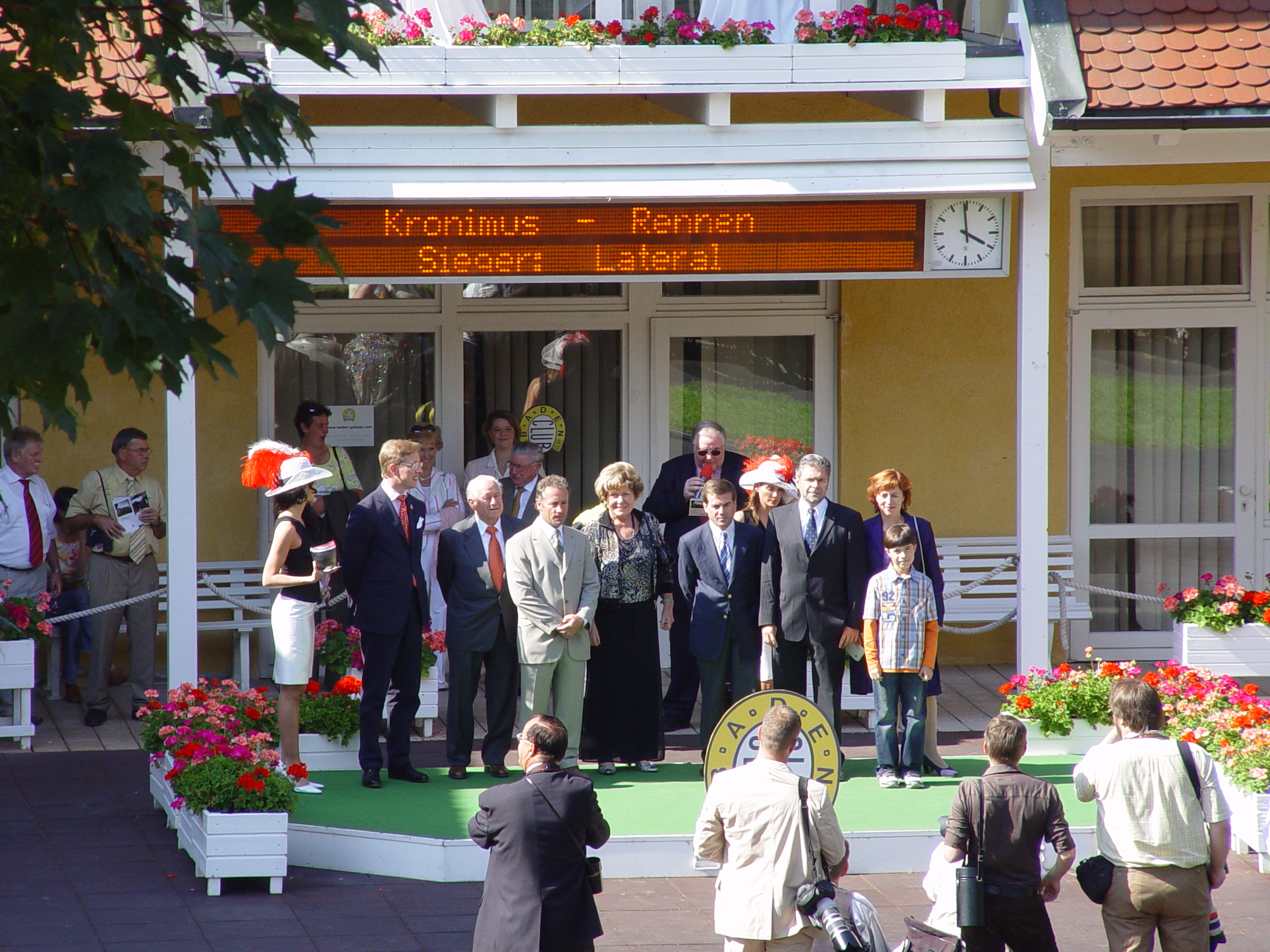
Bernhard, second from left, at the Kronimus race at the Iffezheim racecourse, 2005

A commercial lawyer by training, he studied business administration and law in Hamburg and Switzerland. Prince Bernhard manages the family estates, including Staufenberg Castle, and the margravial wineries dedicated to preserving the grape variety Müller-Thurgau. Between 2000 and 2009, he oversaw the transfer of many family assets, including Eberstein Castle and parts of Schloss Salem, to the German state in order to stabilise the family's finances.

Bernhard has close relations with the British royal family, and his granduncle, Prince Philip, Duke of Edinburgh, often came to Germany to shoot with the Baden family. On 17 April 2021, Bernhard was one of only thirty mourners at Prince Philip's ceremonial funeral at St George's Chapel, Windsor Castle. Bernhard, along with his cousins Philipp, Prince of Hohenlohe-Langenburg, and Donatus, Landgrave of Hesse, was chosen to represent the families of the Duke's late sisters who had been prevented from attending his wedding in 1947. Bernhard and his wife and siblings later attended a service of thanksgiving for Prince Philip's life at Westminster Abbey on 29 March 2022. He and his wife and mother were also present at the state funeral of Queen Elizabeth II at Westminster Abbey and subsequent service of committal at St George's Chapel on 19 September 2022. On 30 March 2023, he and his wife attended a state banquet given by Frank-Walter Steinmeier, President of Germany, at Bellevue Palace during King Charles III and Queen Camilla's state visit to Germany.

On 29 December 2022, his father, Maximilian, died and Bernhard became head of the former grand ducal house of Baden. Though royal and noble titles were abolished in Germany in 1919 when the Weimar Republic was proclaimed, he is sometimes styled and titled His Royal Highness The Margrave of Baden, Duke of Zähringen, by courtesy. Prior to this, he was styled and titled His Grand Ducal Highness Hereditary Prince of Baden. Legally in Germany, these titles form part of his surname.

On 24 April 2025 the Margrave attended the funeral of Andreas, Prince of Saxe-Coburg and Gotha as the representative of Charles III.

== Marriage and children ==
Bernhard married Stephanie Anne Kaul (born 27 June 1966), daughter of Christian Kaul and Hannelore Scheel, in a civil ceremony on 22 June 2001 and a religious ceremony the following day at Schloss Salem. The marriage was acknowledged as dynastic by his father.

The couple have three sons.

The family lives in Linzgau near Schloss Salem.

== Notes and references ==
Bernhard Markgraf von Baden House of Zähringen Born: 27 May 1970
Titles in pretence
Preceded by Maximilian, Margrave of Baden	— TITULAR — Grand Duke of Baden; 29 December 2022 – present Reason for succession failure: Grand Duchy abolished in 1918	Incumbent; Heir: Leopold
