= List of princesses of Denmark =

This is a list of Danish princesses from the establishment of hereditary monarchy by Frederick III in 1648. Individuals holding the title of princess would usually also be styled "Her Royal Highness" (HRH) or "Her Highness" (HH).

== List of Danish princesses since 1648 ==
Not a Danish princess by birth but created a princess of Denmark

List of Danish Princesses
Portrait	Name	Arms	Born	Died	Royal lineage	Notes
	Anna Sophie		1 September 1647	1 July 1717	Daughter of Frederick III and Sophie Amalie of Brunswick-Lüneburg	Married John George III, Elector of Saxony, on 9 October 1666, widowed in 1691.
	Frederica Amalia		11 April 1649	30 October 1704	Daughter of Frederick III and Sophie Amalie of Brunswick-Lüneburg	Married Christian Albert, Duke of Holstein-Gottorp on 24 October 1667, widowed in 1695.
	Wilhelmine Ernestine		21 June 1650	22 April 1706	Daughter of Frederick III and Sophie Amalie of Brunswick-Lüneburg	Married Charles II, Elector Palatine on 20 September 1671, widowed in 1685.
	Ulrika Eleonora		11 September 1656	26 July 1693	Daughter of Frederick III and Sophie Amalie of Brunswick-Lüneburg	Married Charles XI, King of Sweden on 6 May 1680.
	Dorothea		16 November 1657	15 May 1658	Daughter of Frederick III and Sophie Amalie of Brunswick-Lüneburg	Died in infancy.
	Sophia Hedwig		28 August 1677	13 March 1735	Daughter of Christian V and Charlotte Amalie of Hesse-Kassel	Died unmarried.
	Christiane Charlotte		18 January 1679	24 August 1689	Daughter of Christian V and Charlotte Amalie of Hesse-Kassel	Died unmarried.
	Mary		2 June 1685	8 February 1687	Granddaughter of Frederick III and Sophie Amalie of Brunswick-Lüneburg	Also a princess of Great Britain by birth. Died in infancy.
	Anna Sophie		12 May 1686	2 February 1687	Granddaughter of Frederick III and Sophie Amalie of Brunswick-Lüneburg	Also a princess of Great Britain by birth. Died in infancy.
	Mary		14 October 1690	14 October 1690	Granddaughter of Frederick III and Sophie Amalie of Brunswick-Lüneburg	Also a princess of Great Britain by birth. Died in infancy.
	Charlotte Amalie		6 October 1706	28 October 1782	Daughter of Frederick IV and Louise of Mecklenburg-Güstrow	Died unmarried.
	Christiane Amalie		23 October 1723	7 January 1724	Daughter of Frederick IV and Anne Sophie Reventlow	Died in infancy.
	Louise		19 June 1724	20 December 1724	Daughter of Christian VI and Sophie Magdalene of Brandenburg-Kulmbach	Died in infancy.
	Louise		19 October 1726	8 August 1756	Daughter of Christian VI and Sophie Magdalene of Brandenburg-Kulmbach	Married Ernest Frederick III, Duke of Saxe-Hildburghausen on 1 October 1749.
	Sophia Magdalena		3 July 1746	21 August 1813	Daughter of Frederick V and Louise of Great Britain	Heir presumptive to the throne of Denmark 3 June 1747 – 29 January 1749. Married Gustav III, King of Sweden on 1 October 1766, widowed in 1792.
	Wilhelmina Caroline		10 July 1747	14 January 1820	Daughter of Frederick V and Louise of Great Britain	Married William I, Elector of Hesse on 1 September 1764.
	Louise		20 January 1750	12 January 1831	Daughter of Frederick V and Louise of Great Britain	Married Prince Charles of Hesse-Kassel on 30 August 1766.
	Louise Auguste		7 July 1771	13 January 1843	Daughter of Christian VII and Caroline Matilda of Great Britain	Married Frederick Christian II, Duke of Schleswig-Holstein-Sonderburg-Augustenburg on 27 May 1786, widowed in 1814.
	Juliana Marie		2 May 1784	28 October 1784	Granddaughter of Frederick V and Juliana Maria of Brunswick-Wolfenbüttel	Died in infancy.
	Juliane Sophie		18 February 1788	9 May 1850	Granddaughter of Frederick V and Juliana Maria of Brunswick-Wolfenbüttel	Married Princess Wilhelm of Hesse-Philippsthal-Barchfeld on 22 August 1812, widowed 1834.
	Louise Charlotte		30 October 1789	28 March 1864	Granddaughter of Frederick V and Juliana Maria of Brunswick-Wolfenbüttel	Married Prince William of Hesse-Kassel on 10 November 1810; mother of Queen Louise.
	Marie Louise		19 November 1792	12 October 1793	Daughter of Frederick VI and Marie of Hesse-Kassel	Died in infancy.
	Caroline		28 October 1793	31 March 1881	Daughter of Frederick VI and Marie of Hesse-Kassel	Married Ferdinand, Hereditary Prince of Denmark, on 1 August 1829, widowed 1863.
	Louise		21 August 1795	7 December 1795	Daughter of Frederick VI and Marie of Hesse-Kassel	Died in infancy.
	Juliana Louise		12 February 1802	23 February 1802	Daughter of Frederick VI and Marie of Hesse-Kassel	Died in infancy.
	Frederikke Marie		3 June 1805	14 July 1805	Daughter of Frederick VI and Marie of Hesse-Kassel	Died in infancy.
	Vilhelmine Marie		18 January 1808	30 May 1891	Daughter of Frederick VI and Marie of Hesse-Kassel	First Marriage Prince Frederick of Denmark on 1 November 1828, divorced in 1837. Second Marriage Karl, Duke of Schleswig-Holstein-Sonderburg-Glücksburg on 19 May 1838, widowed in 1871.
	Alexandra Caroline Marie Charlotte Louise Julia		1 December 1844	20 November 1925	Daughter of Christian IX and Louise of Hesse-Kassel	Born a princess of Schleswig-Holstein-Sonderburg-Glücksburg, created a Danish princess in 1853. Married Edward VII, King of the United Kingdom and Emperor of India, on 10 March 1863, widowed in 1910.
	Marie Sophie Frederikke Dagmar		26 November 1847	13 October 1928	Daughter of Christian IX and Louise of Hesse-Kassel	Born a princess of Schleswig-Holstein-Sonderburg-Glücksburg, created a Danish princess in 1853. Married Alexander III, Emperor of Russia on 9 November 1866, widowed in 1894.
	Thyra Amalie Caroline Charlotte Anna		29 September 1853	26 February 1933	Daughter of Christian IX and Louise of Hesse-Kassel	Married Ernest Augustus, Crown Prince of Hanover, on 21/22 December 1878, widowed in 1923.
	Alexándra		30 August 1870	24 September 1891	Granddaughter of Christian IX and Louise of Hesse-Kassel	Also a princess of Greece by birth. Married Grand Duke Paul Alexandrovich of Russia on 17 June 1889.
	Louise Caroline Josephine Sophie Thyra Olga		17 February 1875	4 April 1906	Daughter of Frederik VIII and Louise of Sweden	Married Prince Frederick of Schaumburg-Lippe on 5 May 1896.
	María		3 March 1876	14 December 1940	Granddaughter of Christian IX and Louise of Hesse-Kassel	Also a princess of Greece by birth. First Marriage Grand Duke George Mikhailovich of Russia on 30 April 1900, widowed in 1919; Second Marriage Perikles Ioannidis on 16 December 1922.
	Ingeborg Charlotte Caroline Frederikke Louise		2 August 1878	12 March 1958	Daughter of Frederik VIII and Louise of Sweden	Married Prince Carl, Duke of Västergötland on 27 August 1897, widowed in 1951.
	Thyra Louise Caroline Amalie Augusta Elisabeth		14 March 1880	2 November 1945	Daughter of Frederik VIII and Louise of Sweden	Died unmarried.
	Ólga		7 April 1880	2 November 1880	Granddaughter of Christian IX and Louise of Hesse-Kassel	Also a princess of Greece by birth. Died in infancy.
	Dagmar Louise Elisabeth		23 May 1890	11 October 1961	Daughter of Frederik VIII and Louise of Sweden	Married Jørgen Castenskjold on 23 November 1922
	Margrethe Françoise Louise Marie Helene		17 September 1895	18 September 1992	Granddaughter of Christian IX and Louise of Hesse-Kassel	First Roman Catholic Danish princess since the Reformation. Married Prince René of Bourbon-Parma on 9 June 1921, widowed in 1962.
	Helen		2 May 1896	28 November 1982	Great-granddaughter of Christian IX and Louise of Hesse-Kassel	Also a princess of Greece by birth. Married Carol II, King of Romania on 10 March 1921, divorced in 1928.
	Olga		11 June 1903	16 October 1997	Great-granddaughter of Christian IX and Louise of Hesse-Kassel	Also a princess of Greece by birth. Married Prince Paul of Yugoslavia on 22 October 1923, widowed in 1976.
	Irene		13 February 1904	15 April 1974	Great-granddaughter of Christian IX and Louise of Hesse-Kassel	Also a princess of Greece by birth. Married Prince Aimone, Duke of Aosta on 1 July 1939, widowed in 1948.
	Elizabeth		24 May 1904	11 January 1955	Great-granddaughter of Christian IX and Louise of Hesse-Kassel	Also a princess of Greece by birth. Married Carl Theodor, Count of Toerring-Jettenbach on 10 January 1934.
	Margaríta		18 April 1905	24 April 1981	Great-granddaughter of Christian IX and Louise of Hesse-Kassel	Also a princess of Greece by birth. Married Gottfried, Prince of Hohenlohe-Langenburg, on 20 April 1931, widowed in 1960.
	Theodora		30 May 1906	16 October 1969	Great-granddaughter of Christian IX and Louise of Hesse-Kassel	Also a princess of Greece by birth. Married Berthold, Margrave of Baden on 17 August 1931, widowed in 1963.
	Marina		13 December 1906	27 August 1968	Great-granddaughter of Christian IX and Louise of Hesse-Kassel	Also a princess of Greece by birth. Married Prince George, Duke of Kent, on 29 November 1934, widowed in 1942.
	Eugénie		10 February 1910	13 February 1989	Great-granddaughter of Christian IX and Louise of Hesse-Kassel	Also a princess of Greece by birth. First Marriage Dominik Rainer Radziwiłł on 30 May 1938, divorced in 1946. Second Marriage Raimundo, 2nd Duke of Castel Duino on 28 November 1949, divorced in 1965.
	Feodora Louise Caroline-Mathilde Viktoria Alexandra Frederikke Johanne		3 July 1910	17 March 1975	Granddaughter of Frederik VIII and Louise of Sweden	Married Prince Christian of Schaumburg-Lippe on 9 September 1937, widowed in 1974.
	Cecilie		22 June 1911	16 November 1937	Great-granddaughter of Christian IX and Louise of Hesse-Kassel	Also a princess of Greece by birth. Married Georg Donatus, Hereditary Grand Duke of Hesse on 2 February 1931.
	Caroline-Mathilde Louise Dagmar Christine Maud Augusta Ingeborg Thyra Adelheid		27 April 1912	12 December 1995	Granddaughter of Frederik VIII and Louise of Sweden	Married Knud, Hereditary Prince of Denmark on 8 September 1933, widowed in 1976.
	Katherine		4 May 1913	2 October 2007	Great-granddaughter of Christian IX and Louise of Hesse-Kassel	Also a princess of Greece by birth. Married Richard Brandram on 21 April 1947, widowed in 1994.
	Sophie		26 June 1914	24 November 2001	Great-granddaughter of Christian IX and Louise of Hesse-Kassel	Also a princess of Greece by birth. First Marriage Prince Christoph of Hesse on 15 December 1930, widowed in 1943. Second Marriage Prince George William of Hanover on 23 April 1946.
	Alexandrine-Louise Caroline-Mathilde Dagmar		12 December 1914	26 April 1962	Granddaughter of Frederik VIII and Louise of Sweden	Married Count Luitpold of Castell-Castell on 22 January 1937, widowed in 1941.
	Alexandra		25 March 1921	30 January 1993	Great-great-granddaughter of Christian IX and Louise of Hesse-Kassel	Also a princess of Greece by birth. Married Peter II, King of Yugoslavia on 20 March 1944, widowed in 1970.
	Elisabeth Caroline-Mathilde Alexandrine Helena Olga Thyra Feodora Estrid Margrethe Désirée		8 May 1935	19 June 2018	Granddaughter of Christian X and Alexandrine of Mecklenburg-Schwerin	Died unmarried.
	Sofía Margarita Victoria Federica		2 November 1938		Great-great-granddaughter of Christian IX and Louise of Hesse-Kassel	Also a princess of Greece by birth. Married Juan Carlos I, King of Spain on 14 May 1962.
	Margrethe Alexandrine Þórhildur Ingrid later, Margrethe II		16 April 1940		Daughter of Frederik IX and Ingrid of Sweden	Styled as "Princess Margrethe of Denmark" until her succession in 1972 as Margrethe II. Married Henri de Laborde de Monpezat on 10 June 1967, widowed in 2018.
	Irene		11 May 1942	15 January 2026	Great-great-granddaughter of Christian IX and Louise of Hesse-Kassel	Also a princess of Greece by birth
	Benedikte Astrid Ingeborg Ingrid		29 April 1944		Daughter of Frederik IX and Ingrid of Sweden	Married Richard, 6th Prince of Sayn-Wittgenstein-Berleburg on 3 February 1968, widowed in 2017.
	Anne-Marie Dagmar Ingrid		30 August 1946		Daughter of Frederik IX and Ingrid of Sweden	Married Constantine II, King of the Hellenes on 18 September 1964.
	Alexía		10 July 1965		Great-great-great-granddaughter of Christian IX and Louise of Hesse-Kassel	Also a princess of Greece by birth. As Greece abolished the monarchy in 1973, she now only claims the title in pretense, although she was legally a princess of Greece from her birth until 1973. Daughter of Anne-Marie. Married Carlos Morales Quintana on 9 July 1999.
	Theodóra		9 June 1983		Great-great-great-granddaughter of Christian IX and Louise of Hesse-Kassel	Also a princess of Greece by birth. As Greece abolished the monarchy in 1973, she only claims the title in pretense. Daughter of Anne-Marie.
	María Olympía		25 July 1996		Great-great-great-great-granddaughter of Christian IX and Louise of Hesse-Kassel	Also a princess of Greece by birth. As Greece abolished the monarchy in 1973, she only claims the title in pretense.
	Isabella Henrietta Ingrid Margrethe		21 April 2007		Daughter of Frederik X and Mary Donaldson	Additionally created Countess of Monpezat on 30 April 2008.
	Josephine Sophia Ivalo Mathilda		8 January 2011		Daughter of Frederik X and Mary Donaldson	Additionally Countess of Monpezat by birth.
	Athena Marguerite Françoise Marie		24 January 2012		Granddaughter of Margrethe II and Henri de Laborde de Monpezat	Lost her title of princess 1 January 2023. Additionally Countess of Monpezat by birth.
