= Max Markgraf von Baden =

Maximilian
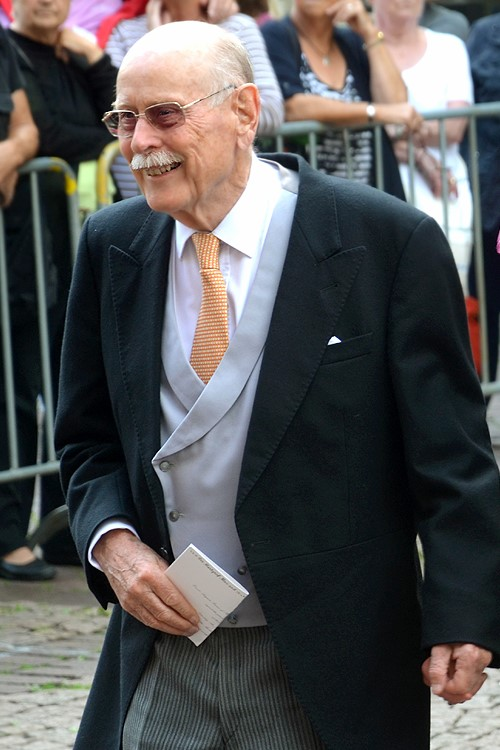
- Maximilian in 2017

Head of the House of Baden
- Tenure: 27 October 1963 – 29 December 2022
- Predecessor: Berthold
- Successor: Bernhard
- Born: Maximilian Andreas Prinz und Markgraf von Baden; 3 July 1933; Salem, Gau Baden, Nazi Germany
- Died: 29 December 2022 (aged 89); Salem, Baden-Württemberg, Germany
- Burial: 13 January 2023; Mimmenhausen Cemetery, Salem, Germany
- Spouse: Archduchess Valerie of Austria (m. 1966)
- Issue: Princess Marie Louise; Bernhard, Margrave of Baden; Prince Leopold; Prince Michael
Names
- Maximilian Andreas Friedrich Gustav Ernst August Bernhard
- House: Baden
- Father: Berthold, Margrave of Baden
- Mother: Princess Theodora of Greece and Denmark

Maximilian Markgraf von Baden (Maximilian Andreas Friedrich Gustav Ernst August Bernhard Prinz und Markgraf von Baden, Herzog von Zähringen 3 July 1933 – 29 December 2022), also known as Max von Baden, was a German businessman and the head of House of Baden. Through his mother, Princess Theodora of Greece and Denmark, the second sister of Prince Philip, Duke of Edinburgh, he was a first cousin of King Charles III of the United Kingdom.

== Early life and family ==
Maximilian was born on 3 July 1933 in Salem. He was the second child and eldest son of Berthold, Margrave of Baden, and his wife, Princess Theodora of Greece and Denmark. He had one older sister, Princess Margarita, and has a younger brother, Prince Ludwig (born 1937).

== Marriage and children ==
Maximilian was briefly engaged to his first cousin, Princess Beatrix of Hohenlohe-Langenburg (daughter of his maternal aunt, Margarita, Princess of Hohenlohe-Langenburg), although this was eventually broken off. In 1963, he followed his father as head of the former grand ducal house of Baden, styled HRH The Margrave of Baden, Duke of Zähringen. In 1966, he married Archduchess Valerie of Austria (b. 1941), daughter of Archduke Hubert Salvator of Austria and his wife, Princess Rosemary of Salm-Salm. They were married civilly on 23 September 1966 at Salem and religiously on 30 September 1966 at Persenbeug Castle in Lower Austria.

The Margrave and Margravine had four children:

- Princess Marie Louise Elisabeth Mathilde Theodora Cecilie Sarah Charlotte of Baden (born Salem, 3 July 1969); she married, civilly, at Salem on 15 September 1999 and religiously on 25 September 1999, Richard Dudley Baker, had issue.
- Bernhard Max Friedrich August Gustav Louis Kraft, Margrave of Baden (born Salem, 27 May 1970)
- Prince Leopold Max Christian Ludwig Clemens Hubert of Baden (born Salem, 1 October 1971), unmarried and without issue.
- Prince Michael Max Andreas of Baden (born Salem, 11 March 1976); he married at Salem on 4 July 2015 Christina Höhne, daughter of Claus Höhne and wife Herlinde or Gerlinde Geiger, without issue.

The Margravine represented the Margrave for the funeral of Queen Elizabeth II, his aunt, at Westminster Abbey in London on 19 September 2022, with Prince Bernhard and his wife, Princess Stephanie.

== Death ==
Maximilian died in Salem Abbey on 29 December 2022, at the age of 89. He was succeeded as titular margrave and head of house by his son Bernhard. The Margrave's funeral service on 13 January 2023 in the church of Salem Abbey was attended by numerous representatives from politics, including the minister president of Baden-Württemberg, Winfried Kretschmann, and royalty and aristocracy, such as King Philippe of Belgium, Prince Albert II of Monaco and his sister Caroline, Princess of Hanover, Prince Hassan of Jordan and the Hereditary Princess of Liechtenstein as well as the heads or representatives of most of the former ruling houses of Germany. His first cousin King Charles III was represented by Donatus, Landgrave of Hesse.

== Ancestry ==
Ancestors of Max Markgraf von Baden

8. Prince William of Baden
4. Prince Maximilian of Baden
9. Princess Maria Maximilianovna of Leuchtenberg
2. Berthold, Margrave of Baden
10. Ernest Augustus, Crown Prince of Hanover
5. Princess Marie Louise of Hanover
11. Princess Thyra of Denmark
1. Maximilian, Margrave of Baden
12. George I of Greece
6. Prince Andrew of Greece and Denmark
13. Olga Constantinovna of Russia
3. Princess Theodora of Greece and Denmark
14. Prince Louis of Battenberg
7. Princess Alice of Battenberg
15. Princess Victoria of Hesse and by Rhine

== Notes ==
Max Markgraf von Baden House of Zähringen Born: 3 July 1933
Titles in pretence
Preceded by Berthold, Margrave of Baden	— TITULAR — Grand Duke of Baden; 27 October 1963 – 29 December 2022; Reason for succession failure: Grand Duchy abolished in 1918	Succeeded by Bernhard, Margrave of Baden
