= List of princesses of Greece =

This is a list of Greek princesses from the accession of George I to the throne of the Kingdom of Greece in 1863.

As male-line descendants of King Christian IX of Denmark, female members of the dynasty bear the title of Princess of Denmark and thus are traditionally referred to as "Princesses of Greece and Denmark". Individuals holding the title of princess would usually also be styled "Her Royal Highness" (HRH), except in the case of the two daughters of Prince Michael, who hold no style, and only bare the title of Princess of Greece.

== List of Greek princesses since 1863 ==
Princess of Greece and Denmark by birth
Princess of Greece by birth (not also a Princess of Denmark)

List of Greek Princesses
Name	Born	Died	Arms	Royal lineage	Notes
Princess Alexandra	1870	1891		1st daughter of King George I	Married Grand Prince Paul Alexandrovich of Russia on 17 June 1889.
Princess Mary	1876	1940		2nd daughter of King George I	Married firstly Grand Prince George Mikhailovich of Russia on 30 April 1900, widowed in 1919; Married secondly Periklís Ioannídis on 16 December 1922.
Princess Olga	1880	1880		3rd daughter of King George I	Died at 7 months.
Princess Helen	1896	1982		1st daughter of King Constantine I	Married Charles, Crown Prince of Romania on 10 March 1921, divorced in 1928.
Princess Olga	1903	1997		1st daughter of Prince Nicholas & Granddaughter of King George I	Married Prince Paul of Yugoslavia on 22 October 1923, widowed in 1976.
Princess Irene	1904	1974		2nd daughter of King Constantine I	Married Prince Aimone, Duke of Aosta on 1 July 1939, widowed in 1948.
Princess Elizabeth	1904	1955		2nd daughter of Prince Nicholas & Granddaughter of King George I	Married Carl Theodor, Count of Toerring-Jettenbach on 10 January 1934.
Princess Margaret	1905	1981		1st daughter of Prince Andrew & Granddaughter of King George I	Married Gottfried, Prince of Hohenlohe-Langenburg on 20 April 1931, widowed in 1960.
Princess Theodora	1906	1969		2nd daughter of Prince Andrew & Granddaughter of King George I	Married Berthold, Margrave of Baden on 17 August 1931, widowed in 1963.
Princess Marina	1906	1968		3rd daughter of Prince Nicholas & Granddaughter of King George I	Married Prince George, Duke of Kent on 29 November 1934, widowed in 1942.
Princess Eugenie	1910	1989		Only daughter of Prince George & Granddaughter of King George I	Married firstly Prince Dominik Radziwiłł on 30 May 1938, divorced in 1946. Second Marriage Prince Raimundo, Duke of Castel Duino on 28 November 1949, divorced in 1965.
Princess Cecilie	1911	1937		3rd daughter of Prince Andrew & Granddaughter of King George I	Married George Donatus, Hereditary Grand Duke of Hesse and by Rhine on 2 February 1931.
Princess Katherine	1913	2007		3rd daughter of King Constantine I	Married Richard Brandram on 21 April 1947, widowed in 1994.
Princess Sophia	1914	2001		4th daughter of Prince Andrew & Granddaughter of King George I	Married firstly Prince Christoph of Hesse on 15 December 1930, widowed in 1943. Married secondly Prince George William of Hanover 23 April 1946.
Princess Alexandra	1921	1993		Only daughter of King Alexander I	Married Peter II of Yugoslavia on 20 March 1944, widowed in 1970.
Princess Sophia Margaret Victoria Frederica	1938			1st daughter of King Paul I	Married Juan Carlos I of Spain on 14 May 1962.
Princess Irene	1942	2026		2nd daughter of King Paul I	Hereditary Princess from 6 March 1964 until 10 July 1965.
Princess Alexandra Helle Frances Mary	1968			1st daughter of Prince Michael & Great-granddaughter of King George I	Married Nicolas Mirzayantz on 27 June 1998.
Princess Olga Elizabeth	1971			2nd daughter of Prince Michael & Great-granddaughter of King George I	Married Prince Aimone, 6th Duke of Aosta on 16 September 2008.
Princess Alexia	1965			1st daughter of King Constantine II	Hereditary Princess from birth until 20 May 1967. Married Carlos Morales y Quintana on 9 July 1999.
Princess Theodora	1983			2nd daughter of King Constantine II	Married Matthew Kumar on 28 September 2024.
Princess Maria-Olympia	1996			Only daughter of Crown Prince Pavlos & Granddaughter of King Constantine II	
