= Lilly Marcou =

French historian (1936–2026)

Lilly Marcou (9 July 1936 – 1 July 2026) was a Romanian-born French historian who specialised in the history of communism.

== Life and career ==
Lilly Marcou was born in Iași, Romania on 9 July 1936. She graduated in literature from the University of Bucharest. In 1986, she obtained a doctorate in history from the Paris-Sorbonne University.

She pursued her career at the Center for International Studies and Research (CERI) at Paris Institute of Political Studies. From 1975 to 1981, she led a research group on the international communist movement. From 1982 to 1988, she taught at the Sciences Po.

From 1993, she devoted her research to the study of Soviet archives from the Stalin era in Moscow.

In April 2007, she was named Knight of the Legion of Honor.

Marcou died on 1 July 2026, at the age of 89.

== Works ==
- Le Kominform. Le communisme de guerre froide, Paris, Presses de Sciences-Po, 1977.
- L'Internationale après Staline, Paris, Grasset, 1979.
- Staline vu par les hôtes du Kremlin, Paris, Gallimard, 1979.
- Une Enfance stalinienne, Paris, PUF, 1982, 190 p.
- L'URSS vue de gauche (dir.), Paris, PUF, 1984, 200 p
- Les Pieds d'argile, le communisme mondial au présent, 1970-1986, Paris, Ramsay, 1986, 492 p.
- La Guerre froide, l'engrenage, Bruxelles, Éditions Complexe, 1987, 275 p.
- Les Défis de Gorbatchev, Paris, Plon, 1988, 275 p.
- Le Mouvement communiste international depuis 1945, Paris, PUF, 1990, 128 p.
- Ilya Ehrenburg, un homme dans son siècle, Paris, Plon, 1992, 379 p.
- Elsa Triolet, les yeux et la mémoire, Paris, Plon, 1994, 419 p.
- Staline. Vie privée, Paris, Calmann-Lévy, 1996, 343 p.
- Le Crépuscule du communisme, Paris, Presses de Sciences Po, 1997, 125 p.
- Des Partis comme les autres ? Les anciens communistes en Europe de l’Est, avec Guy Hermet, Bruxelles, Éditions Complexe, 1998, 165 p.
- Le Roi trahi, Carol II de Roumanie, Paris, Pygmalion, 2002, 345 p.
- Les Héritiers, Pygmalion, 2004.
- Napoléon face aux Juifs, Paris, Pygmalion, 2006, 180 p.
- Napoléon et les femmes, Paris, La Martinière, 2008, 239 p.
