= Berthold, Margrave of Baden =

Margrave of Baden (1906–1963)

Berthold
- Margrave of Baden
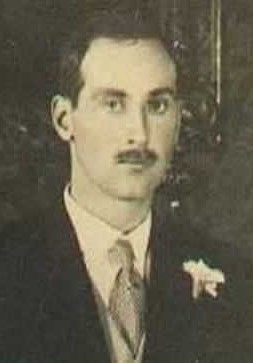
- Photographed in 1931

Head of the House of Baden
- Tenure: 6 November 1929 – 27 October 1963
- Predecessor: Prince Maximilian of Baden
- Successor: Maximilian, Margrave of Baden
- Born: 24 February 1906; Karlsruhe, German Empire
- Died: 27 October 1963 (aged 57); Spaichingen, West Germany
- Burial: Mimmenhausen Cemetery, Salem, Germany
- Spouse: Princess Theodora of Greece and Denmark (m. 1931)
- Issue: Princess Margarita; Maximilian, Margrave of Baden; Prince Ludwig
Names
- Berthold Friedrich Wilhelm Ernst August Heinrich Karl
- House: Baden
- Father: Prince Maximilian of Baden
- Mother: Princess Marie Louise of Hanover and Cumberland

Berthold Prinz und Markgraf von Baden, Herzog von Zähringen (24 February 1906 – 27 October 1963), styled Margrave of Baden was the head of the House of Baden, which had reigned over the Grand Duchy of Baden until 1918, from 1929 until his death. He was the brother-in-law of Prince Philip, Duke of Edinburgh, through his marriage to Philip's sister, Princess Theodora of Greece and Denmark.

== Marriage and children ==
The only son and younger child of Prince Maximilian, Margrave of Baden and Princess Marie Louise of Hanover, Berthold married his second cousin Princess Theodora of Greece and Denmark, daughter of Prince Andrew of Greece and Denmark and Princess Alice of Battenberg, on 17 August 1931 in Baden-Baden. Via his marriage, he was the brother-in-law of Prince Philip of Greece and Denmark, later Prince Philip, Duke of Edinburgh from November 1947. His bride was also his second cousin, through Christian IX of Denmark.

The couple had three children:

- Princess Margarita Alice Thyra Viktoria Marie Louise Scholastica (Salem, 14 July 1932 – London, 15 January 2013), married, civilly, in Salem on 5 June 1957 and religiously on 6 June Prince Tomislav of Yugoslavia, had issue; divorced in 1981.
- Prince Max Andreas Friedrich Gustav Ernst August Bernhard (3 July 1933 – 29 December 2022), married civilly on 23 September 1966 at Salem and religiously on 30 September at Persenbeug Castle, Austria, Archduchess Valerie of Austria, had issue.
- Prince Ludwig Wilhelm Georg Ernst Christoph (b. Karlsruhe, 16 March 1937), married civilly to Princess Anna Maria (Marianne) Henrietta Eleonora Gobertina of Auersperg-Breunner (b. Zseliz, Hungary, today Želiezovce, Slovakia, 15 December 1943) in Salem on 21 September 1967 and religiously in Wald, Lower Austria, on 21 October, and has three children.

== Personal life ==
He was conscripted as a soldier into the army of the Wehrmacht, but served only briefly and was exempted from military service in 1940 after being injured in France.

== Death ==
Berthold died on 27 October 1963, aged 57, in Spaichingen. He was in a car driving with his son when he suddenly died, probably from a heart attack. He was succeeded as titular margrave and head of house by his son Max.

== Bibliography ==
- Eade, Philip (2012). Young Prince Philip: His Turbulent Early Life. HarperPress. ISBN 978-0-00-730539-1.
- Vickers, Hugo (2000). Alice: Princess Andrew of Greece. Londres: Hamish Hamilton. ISBN 978-0-241-13686-7.

Berthold, Margrave of Baden House of Zähringen Born: 24 February 1906 Died: 27 October 1963
Titles in pretence
Preceded by Prince Maximilian of Baden	— TITULAR — Grand Duke of Baden; 6 November 1929 – 27 October 1963; Reason for succession failure: Grand Duchy abolished in 1918	Succeeded by Maximilian, Margrave of Baden
