= Danica, Hereditary Princess of Serbia =

Member of the House of Karađorđević

Danica
- Hereditary Princess of Serbia and Yugoslavia
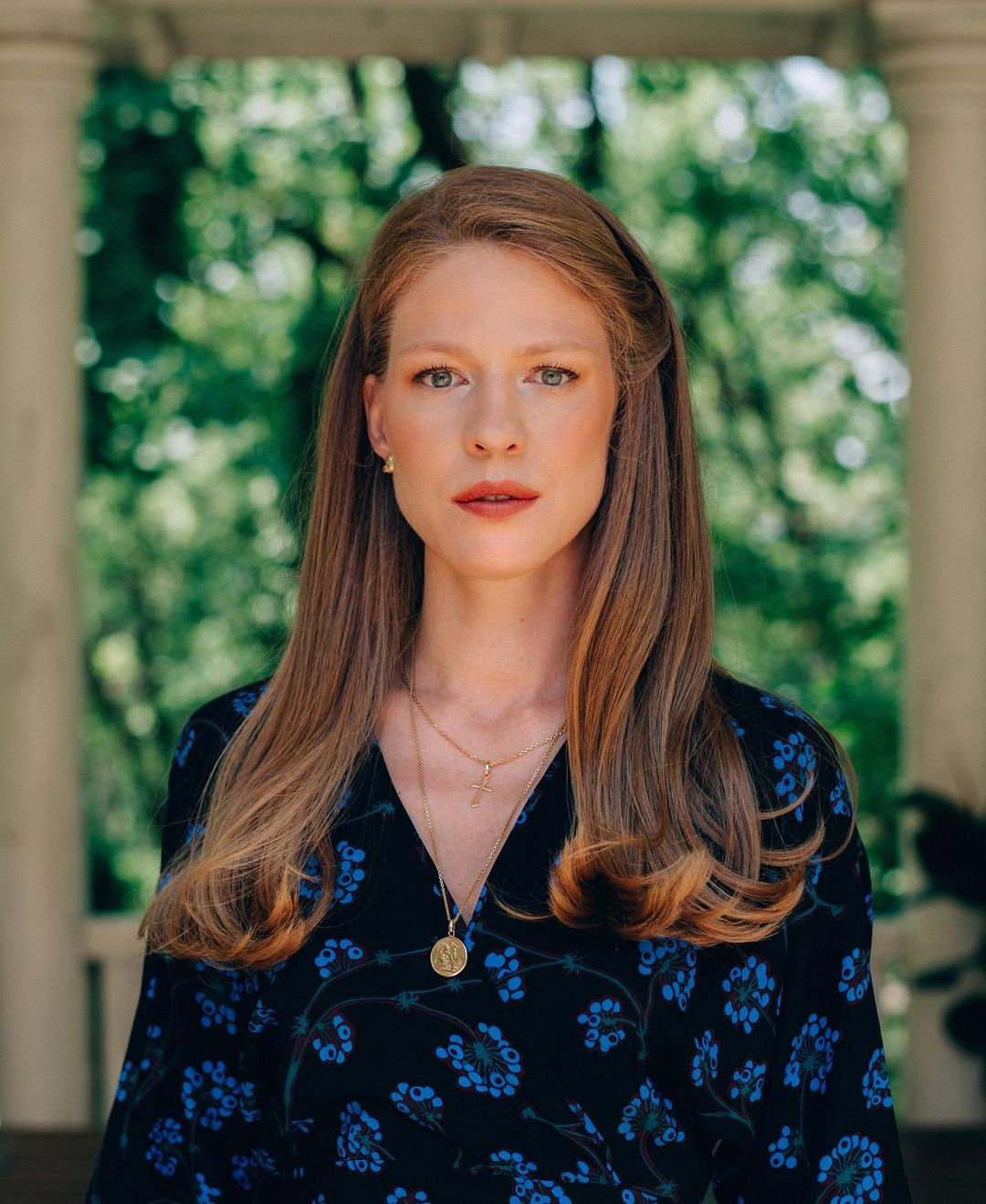
- Danica in 2022
- Born: Danica Marinković; 18 August 1986 (age 40); Belgrade, Serbia, Yugoslavia
- Spouse: Prince Philip, Hereditary Prince of Serbia (m. 2017)
- Issue: Prince Stefan; Princess Marija
- House: Karađorđević (by marriage)
- Father: Milan "Cile" Marinković
- Mother: Zorica "Beba" Krupež
- Religion: Serbian Orthodox
- Occupation: Graphic designer

Princess Danica, Hereditary Princess of Serbia (née Marinković, Serbian Cyrillic: Даница Карађорђевић, née Маринковић; born 18 August 1986), also known as Princess Danica Karađorđević, is a Serbian–French graphic designer and is the wife of Prince Philip, heir to Crown Prince Alexander of Serbia, and so she is a member of the House of Karađorđević, the deposed royal family of Yugoslavia and Serbia.

== Early life and education ==
Princess Danica was born in Belgrade, SR Serbia, SFR Yugoslavia (now Serbia) on 18 August 1986 as Danica Marinković. She is the daughter of Milan "Cile" Marinković (b. 1947 in Belgrade), an impressionist painter, and his wife, Zorica "Beba" Krupež. Since 1992, Danica has lived in Paris, France, completed her education there and obtained French citizenship. She graduated in graphic design and visual communications at the Academy of Applied Arts in Paris and at the comparative literature and Slavistics studies at Sorbonne University in Paris. In London, U.K., the Princess got her master's degree in graphic design and communication at the Chelsea College of Arts, University of the Arts London.

== Personal life ==
=== Design career ===
Well known under the artistic name Dana Maar (stylized as Dana MAAR), besides the primary graphic design profession, she creatively expresses herself as a collagist. Her already recognizable style is manifested through the collages she creates and actively exhibits through solo and group exhibitions and art fairs, thus becoming part of the cultural milieu of both Belgrade and Paris. Among numerous solo exhibitions in Belgrade, Princess Danica had solo exhibitions in Parisian galleries: Galerie Origines and Galleries Artessepia within the Carré Rive Gauche event, Saint-Germain des Près, in 2007 and 2008. Her works were also exhibited at the Biennale of Contemporary Art in Paris in 2008, 2010 and 2014. She has been a member of the Applied Artists and Designers Association of Serbia in the design section since 2010.

=== Marriage and children ===
On 24 July 2017, her engagement to Prince Philip of Serbia was announced. They married on 7 October 2017, at the Cathedral Church of Saint Michael the Archangel in Belgrade, Serbia. Their witnesses were Victoria, Crown Princess of Sweden and Philip's older brother Prince Peter. Several members of foreign royal families also attended, including Queen Sofía of Spain, Princess Anne, Duchess of Calabria, Prince Guillaume of Luxembourg with his wife Sibilla of Luxembourg, Prince Amyn Aga Khan, Princess Jeet of Nabha Khemka, as well as numerous relatives and guests of the Karađorđević royal family and the Marinković family, including president of the National Assembly of Serbia Maja Gojković among others. It was the first royal wedding in Serbia since 1922 and the wedding of King Alexander I and Princess Maria of Romania, the paternal grand-grandparents of her husband. Her wedding gown was created by Serbian fashion designer Roksanda Ilinčić.

Princess Danica gave birth to their son, Prince Stefan, in Belgrade on 25 February 2018, at 10:30 am. Stefan is the first male child born to the royal family on Serbian soil for 90 years, the last such birth being that of Prince Tomislav in Belgrade in 1928. The prince was baptized on December 15, 2018, at the Royal Palace's Chapel in Belgrade. Danica gave birth to their daughter, Princess Marija, on 5 November 2023, in Belgrade.

== Public life ==
=== Princess in Serbia (2020–2022) ===
Princess Danica and her family lived in London after 2017, but as of July 2020 they relocated and currently live in her hometown, Belgrade.

On 22 November 2020, Princess Danica and Prince Philip were the only members of the House of Karađorđević who attended the funeral service of Serbian Patriarch Irinej at the Church of Saint Sava. Princess Danica and Prince Filip were also the only members of the House of Karađorđević who attended enthronement of newly elected Patriarch Porfirije on 19 February 2021 in St. Michael's Cathedral in Belgrade.

On 13 September 2021, Danica and her husband attended Holy Liturgy led by Patriarch Porfirije in the Jasenovac Monastery in Croatia and visited the Jasenovac concentration camp and Stone Flower sculpture becoming first members of the House of Karađorđević who visited this memorial site from World War II.

On 9 January 2022, Danica and her husband attended the National Day celebration of the Republika Srpska, one of the two entities of Bosnia and Herzegovina, in Banja Luka.

=== Hereditary Princess (2022–present) ===
On 27 April 2022, Princess Danica witnessed when her brother-in-law Prince Peter renounced his title of Hereditary Prince of Serbia and Yugoslavia – for himself and his descendants – in favor of her husband Philip, making her the Hereditary Princess. The ceremony took place in Seville at Casa de Pilatos in the presence of Peter's and Philip's mother Princess Maria Da Gloria of Orléans-Braganza and Duchess of Segorbe, and others.

Since 2024 she and her family reside at Thatched House, within the Dedinje Royal Compound.

== Honours ==
- (Kingdom of Serbia) House of Karađorđević: Dame Grand Cross of the Royal Order of Saint Sava (11 May 2024).

=== Arms ===
Coat of arms of Princess Danica of Serbia

Notes
All heraldic questions pertaining to the House of Karađorđević are under jurisdiction of the Herald of the House. The blessing of having numerous offspring in the House requires further codification for the members of the House so that a clear system of identification among the generations is enabled. The decree is not signed yet although it was verbally confirmed by the Head of the House so it is possible to give the graphical illustration of the proposed system.
The Princess bears the arms of her husband with a difference in the shape of escutcheon.
Adopted
2017
Coronet
The Karađorđević Crown with the blue fleur-de-lis in the centre.
Escutcheon
Upon the red oval shield there is a white double-headed eagle displayed with both heads crowned with the heraldic crown of Serbia, beak, tongue and legs of the white color and upon the breast of the eagle a red shield with the cross to the shield's edges between which there are four firesteels with their operating surfaces turned towards the vertical beam of the cross all of white color and in the base of the shield two white fleur-de-lis.

== See also ==
- List of princesses of Serbia
- Serbs in France
