= Alexander of Serbia =

Alexander of Serbia or Alexander Karađorđević may refer to:

- Alexander Karađorđević, Prince of Serbia (1806–1885), reigned 1842 to 1858
- King Alexander I of Serbia (1876–1903), reigned 1889 to 1903
- King Alexander I of Yugoslavia (1888–1934), reigned 1921 to 1934
- Prince Alexander of Yugoslavia (1924–2016), son of Prince Regent Paul of Yugoslavia
- Alexander, Crown Prince of Yugoslavia (born 1945), current pretender
- Prince Alexander of Yugoslavia (born 1982), son of Crown Prince Alexander of Yugoslavia

== See also ==
- Alexander of Yugoslavia (disambiguation)
