= Philip, Hereditary Prince of Yugoslavia =

Member of the House of Karađorđević

Philip
- Hereditary Prince of Serbia and Yugoslavia
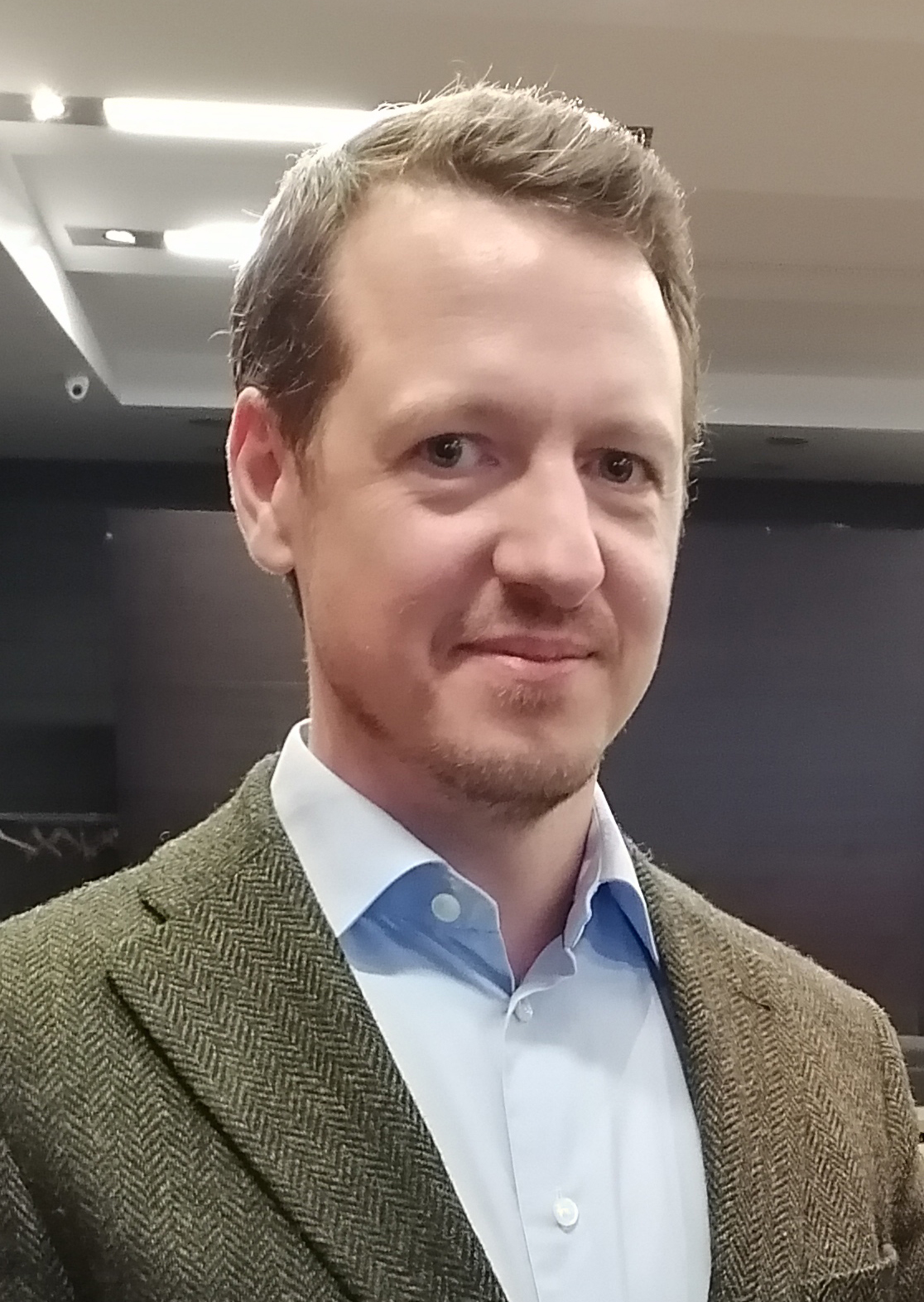
- Prince Philip in 2022
- Born: 15 January 1982 (age 44); Vienna, Virginia, U.S.
- Spouse: Danica Marinković (m. 2017)
- Issue: Prince Stefan; Princess Marija
- House: Karađorđević
- Father: Alexander, Crown Prince of Yugoslavia
- Mother: Princess Maria da Gloria of Orléans-Braganza
- Religion: Serbian Orthodox
- Occupation: Finance manager; asset manager

Filip Karađorđević (Serbian Cyrillic: Филип Карађорђевић; born 15 January 1982), sometimes referred to in English as Prince Philip Karageorgevitch and unofficially styled as Philip, Hereditary Prince of Serbia and Yugoslavia (Serbian Cyrillic: Филип, принц наследник од Србије и Југославије, Filip, princ naslednik od Srbije i Jugoslavije), is a Serbian business manager, a member of the House of Karađorđević, and heir apparent to Crown Prince Alexander. He is the second grandson of the last King of Yugoslavia, Peter II.

Born in the United States and raised in the United Kingdom, he has worked in finance and asset management. In 2020, he moved to his homeland Serbia and took a more active role in public life, often travelling across Serbia, Kosovo, Montenegro, and Bosnia. His son is the first male child born to the Karađorđević royal family on Serbian soil for 90 years. In 2022, he became the hereditary prince, following his elder brother's renunciation.

== Early life and education ==
Prince Philip was born on 15 January 1982 in Vienna, Virginia, as the second son and second child of the last Crown Prince of the former Kingdom of Yugoslavia, Alexander, and his first wife, Princess Maria da Gloria of Orléans-Braganza, the eldest daughter of Pedro Gastão of Orléans-Braganza, a claimant to the defunct Brazilian throne, and Princess Maria de la Esperanza of Bourbon-Two Sicilies (1914–2005), a maternal aunt of King Juan Carlos I of Spain. Philip is the fraternal twin of Alexander. His godparents are Queen Sofía of Spain, King Constantine II of Greece (both first cousins of his paternal grandmother), and Princess Anne, Duchess of Calabria (first cousin of his mother). Besides the twin brother, he has an older brother, Peter (b. 1980). Philip lived in Virginia until 1984. In 1982, he and his twin brother were baptized by Lavrentije, Serbian Orthodox Bishop of Western Europe, at a castle in Villamanrique de la Condesa, near Seville, Spain.

Philip's parents divorced in 1985. After the divorce, his father remarried Katherine Clairy Batis later that year, while his mother remarried Ignacio, Duke of Segorbe, member of the House of Medinaceli, later that year. Philip has two younger half-sisters through his mother, Sol María de la Blanca Medina y Orléans-Braganza, 54th Countess of Ampurias (b. 1986) and Ana Luna Medina y Orléans-Braganza, 17th Countess of Ricla (b. 1988).

Together with his twin brother, Philip was educated in London and Canterbury. In June 2000, Philip completed sixth form at The King's School, Canterbury, obtaining three A levels and ten GCSEs. He was awarded a BA from University College London after his university studies. In 2003–04, he joined a student exchange program at a university in Madrid. Also, he finished École hôtelière de Lausanne in Switzerland.

In 1991, Philip, with his father and brothers, briefly visited Belgrade, Yugoslavia. In February 2001, the Parliament of FR Yugoslavia passed legislation conferring citizenship on members of the Karađorđević family, making Philip eligible for Yugoslav citizenship. In July 2001, his father and step-mother moved to Belgrade, Serbia, FR Yugoslavia. After the dissolution of FR Yugoslavia (later renamed Serbia and Montenegro), Philip obtained citizenship of Serbia.

== Personal life ==
After completing his studies, Philip started to work for financial institutions in the City of London. There he worked as finance manager for Landsbanki and Teather & Greenwood. Then, he worked in the Ritz Hotel in London. Afterwards, he worked for the Cyprus-based global hedge fund IKOS. Most recently, Philip has been working with a renowned global asset manager in London. Philip lived and worked in London until 2020, when he relocated to Serbia and started to work remotely following the COVID-19 pandemic in Europe.

Philip completed the 2010 Athens Marathon, the 2011 Belgrade Half-marathon, and the 2014 London Marathon.

=== Marriage and children ===
On 24 July 2017, his parents announced his engagement to Danica Marinković.

Philip married Danica Marinković on 7 October 2017 at the Cathedral Church of Saint Michael the Archangel in Belgrade, Serbia. Their witnesses were Victoria, the Crown Princess of Sweden and his brother Peter. His two godmothers, Queen Sofía of Spain and Princess Anne, Duchess of Calabria, attended the wedding. It was the first royal wedding in Serbia since the 1922 wedding of his great-grandfather King Alexander I and Princess Maria of Romania. Several members of royal families also attended, including Prince Guillaume of Luxembourg with his wife, Prince Amyn Aga Khan, Princess Jeet Nabha Khemka, and guests of the Karađorđević Royal Family and the Marinković family, including the president of the National Assembly of Serbia Maja Gojković among others.

Princess Danica gave birth to their son, Prince Stefan, in Belgrade on 25 February 2018 at 10:30 am. Stefan is the first male child born to the royal family on Serbian soil in 90 years, the last such birth being that of Prince Tomislav in Belgrade in 1928. Stefan was baptized on 15 December 2018 at the Royal Palace's Chapel in Belgrade.

On 5 November 2023 in Belgrade, Philip and Danica welcomed their second child, a daughter. They named her Princess Marija.

== Public life ==
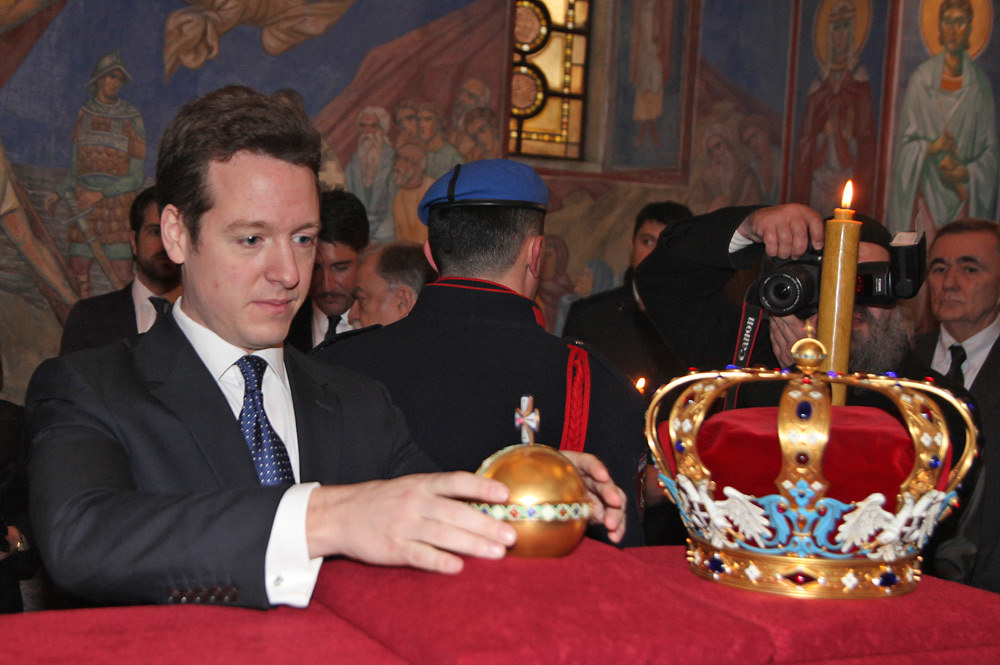
Prince Philip placing the Royal Orb near the Karađorđević Crown in 2013

Prince Philip attended the reburial of his grandparents, King Peter II and Queen Alexandra, great-grandmother Queen Maria, and granduncle Prince Andrew in the Royal Family Mausoleum at Oplenac on 26 May 2013. The Serbian Royal Regalia were placed over King Peter's coffin, having Philip placed the Royal Orb and Sceptre near the Karađorđević Crown.

On 17 July 2015, Prince Philip and his brothers attended their father's 70th birthday celebration in Royal Compound, Belgrade. The event gathered 400 guests, including Carl XVI Gustaf of Sweden and Albert II of Monaco.

=== Prince in Serbia (2020–2022) ===
Philip used to live in London with his family, a wife and a son, but as of July 2020, they relocated and currently live in Belgrade, Serbia. With his relocation to Serbia, Philip fulfilled the promise he gave to Serbian Patriarch Irinej to do so.

In January 2020, Prince Philip voiced support for the clerical protests in Montenegro.

On 22 November 2020, Philip and his wife, Princess Danica, were the only members of the House of Karađorđević who attended the funeral service of Patriarch Irinej at the Church of Saint Sava. Prince Philip and his wife were also the only members of the House of Karađorđević who attended the enthronement of newly elected Patriarch Porfirije on 19 February 2021 in St. Michael's Cathedral in Belgrade.

In April 2021, before Easter, Philip visited Kosovo to support the Serbian community there. He also became the first member of the House of Karađorđević after his grand-grandfather, King Alexander I, who travelled to Prizren. He and his wife travelled there for a weekend visiting the Orthodox Seminary, Our Lady of Ljeviš Church, Cathedral of Saint George, and Church of St. Nicholas. Also, they visited Velika Hoča, Orahovac, and the monasteries Patriarchate of Peć and Zočište during the trip.

On 13 September 2021, Philip and his wife, Princess Danica, attended Holy Liturgy led by Patriarch Porfirije in the Jasenovac Monastery in Croatia and visited the Jasenovac concentration camp and Stone Flower sculpture, becoming the first members of the House of Karađorđević who visited this memorial site from World War II.

In December 2021, Philip voiced support for the environmental protests in Serbia.

In February 2022, Philip and his wife travelled to Han Pijesak, Bosnia and Herzegovina. They met with local authorities and took over the keys to the summer house of the Karađorđević family. The summer house was built by King Alexander I in the early 1920s and used by his family until 1941. Afterwards, the house was used for the command of the Ustaša Commissioner Jure Francetić during World War II. After the war, the house was commonly known as Tito's Villa, although Yugoslav communist president Josip Broz Tito never stayed there. Devastated by time, the summer house will be rebuilt and renovated as Prince Philip has agreed with local authorities and the Government of Republika Srpska to fund it. According to some sources, the Vidovdan Constitution was signed in the summer house. Furthermore, on 10 February, Prince Philip and his wife met with Milorad Dodik, a Serb member of the Presidency of Bosnia and Herzegovina.

On 21 March 2022, Philip and his wife signed the People's initiative to ban the exploitation of lithium and boron in Serbia.

=== Hereditary Prince (2022–present) ===
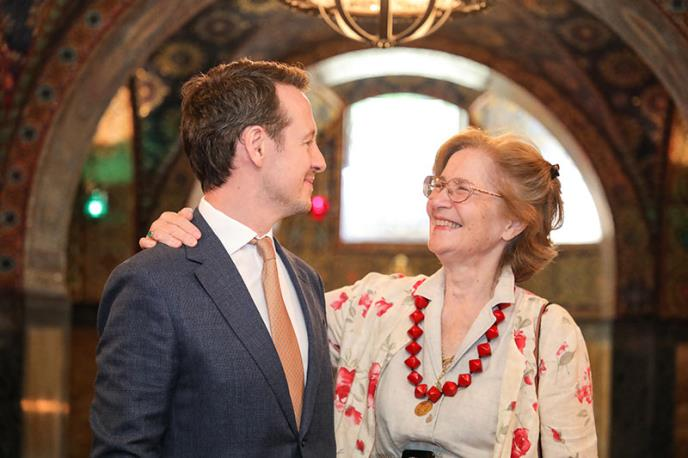
Philip with his mother, Princess Maria da Gloria of Orleans-Braganza, Duchess of Segorbe in the Crypt of Oplenac church

On 27 April 2022, his elder brother Prince Peter renounced the title of a hereditary prince – for himself and his descendants. Philip became the Hereditary Prince of Serbia and Yugoslavia, heir apparent to his father, Alexander. The ceremony took place at Casa de Pilatos in Seville, Spain, in the presence of his mother, Princess Maria da Gloria, his stepfather Duke Ignacio, his wife Princess Danica, his half-sister Countess Sol, Ljubodrag Grujić, a member of the Crown Council, Chancellor of the Orders and the Herald of the House of Karađorđević and Nikola Stanković, Chief of Staff of the Crown Prince. His father, Crown Prince Alexander, did not attend the event. The Crown Prince was dissatisfied with Peter's renunciation. A grandson of King Alexander I of Yugoslavia, Prince Michael, supported the act.

On 5 May 2022, Philip and his wife attended mass at the Cathedral of Saint-Louis des Invalides in Paris in honour of Napoleon I and soldiers of the Grande Armée who died for France, by invitation from his cousin Jean-Christophe, Prince Napoléon, a descendant of Napoleon, and his wife, Princess Olympia. Afterwards, they travelled to Mileševa Monastery in southwest Serbia and Pljevlja, Montenegro, attending the Holy Liturgy in Mileševa led by Patriarch Porfirije and Metropolitan Joanikije II of Montenegro and the Littoral.

In the first week of June 2022, Philip and his family travelled to Kosovo, visiting Gazimestan, Gračanica Monastery, Prizren (Church of the Holy Saviour and Monastery of the Holy Archangels), Priština (St. Nicholas Church), and Visoki Dečani Monastery. During his visits, he opened Vidovdanske svečanosti (transl. The Solemnity of Vidovdan) in Gračanica and Spasovdanski dani (transl. The Days of Spasovdan) in Prizren. Furthermore, Prince Philip gave a copy of Prince Peter's renunciation paper to the library of Visoki Dečani Monastery.

On 11 September 2022, Philip and his wife attended a march from Loznica to the top of Gučevo mountain in honour of soldiers fallen in the Battle of the Drina in September 1914.

In May 2023, Philip and his wife attended the Serbia Against Violence protests in Belgrade, following the Belgrade school shooting and a mass murder near Mladenovac and Smederevo.

Since 2024 he and his family reside at Thatched House.

== Ancestry ==
Philip is a member of the House of Karađorđević. Through his father, Philip descends from kings Nicholas I of Montenegro, Ferdinand I of Romania, Christian IX of Denmark, and Alexander of Greece, and furthermore from emperors Nicholas I of Russia and Frederick III of the Germans and Queen Victoria of the United Kingdom of Great Britain and Ireland. In 2010, several sources reported that he was among the top 100 in the line of succession to the British throne.

Through his mother, Philip descends from the Emperor Pedro II of Brazil, and kings Louis Philippe I of France and Francis I of the Two Sicilies, and furthermore from Francis I, Holy Roman Emperor and his Empress Maria Theresa, and king Charles III of Spain.

== Arms ==
Coat of arms of Prince Philip of Serbia
Notes All heraldic questions of the House of Karađorđević are under the jurisdiction of the Herald of the House. The blessing of having numerous offspring in the House requires further codification for the members of the House so that a transparent system of identification among the generations is enabled. The decree is not signed yet, although the Head of the House verbally confirmed it, so it is possible to give a graphical illustration of the proposed system. Adopted July 2015 Coronet The Karađorđević Crown with the blue fleur-de-lis in the centre. Escutcheon Upon the Gules Iberian style shield, there is a white double-headed eagle displayed with both heads crowned with the heraldic crown of Serbia, beak, tongue and legs of the white colour and upon the breast of the eagle a red shield with the cross to the shield's edges between which there are four firesteels with their operating surfaces turned towards the vertical beam of the cross all of the white colour and in the base of the shield two white fleurs-de-lis.

Philip, Hereditary Prince of Yugoslavia House of Karađorđević Born: 15 January 1982
Titles in pretence
Preceded by Prince Peter	— TITULAR — Hereditary Prince of Serbia and Yugoslavia; 27 April 2022 – present	Incumbent; Heir: Prince Stephen
Lines of succession
Preceded by Crown Prince Alexander	Succession to the former Serbian throne 2nd in line	Followed by Prince Stephen
