= Peter of Yugoslavia =

Peter of Yugoslavia may refer to:

- Peter I of Serbia (1844–1921), last King of Serbia (1903–1918) and first King of the Serbs, Croats and Slovenes (1918–1921)
- Peter II of Yugoslavia (1923–1970), last King of Yugoslavia
- Peter, Hereditary Prince of Yugoslavia (born 1980), American, the eldest son of Alexander, Crown Prince of Yugoslavia and Princess Maria da Gloria of Orléans Bragança, grandson of King Peter II
