= Alexander of Yugoslavia =

Alexander of Yugoslavia may refer to:

- King Alexander I of Yugoslavia (1888–1934), reigned 1921 to 1934
- Prince Alexander of Yugoslavia (1924–2016), son of Prince Regent Paul of Yugoslavia
- Alexander, Crown Prince of Yugoslavia (born 1945), current pretender
- Prince Alexander of Yugoslavia (born 1982), son of Crown Prince Alexander of Yugoslavia
- Alexandar of Yugoslavia (TV series), a TV series about Alexandar I of Yugoslavia from 2021
- Alexandar of Yugoslavia (novel), a novel from 2018 about Alexandar I of Yugoslavia, written by Vuk Drašković

== See also ==
- Alexandra of Yugoslavia (1921–1993)
