= Peter Karageorgevitch =

Peter Karageorgevitch (Serbian Cyrillic: Петар Карађорђевић, romanized: Petar Karađorđević) may refer to:

- Peter I of Serbia (1844–1921)
- Peter II of Yugoslavia (1923–1970)
- Prince Peter of Yugoslavia (born 1980)
