= Smederevska Sedmica =

Serbian independent local magazine

- Cover of Smederevska Sedmica No 259 with Alexander II Karađorđević during his first visit to Smederevo, May 25, 2003.
- Type: Local Independent Media
- Format: A4
- Owner: Milan Petrović
- Publisher: EUROPRESS, Smederevo
- Editor: Miroslav Đorđević
- Founded: 2 September 1997
- Ceased publication: 15 July 2005
- Language: Serbian
- Headquarters: Smederevo, Serbia

Smederevska Sedmica (Serbian Cyrillic: Смедеревска Седмица) was an independent local magazine in Serbia, published weekly between September 1997 and July 2005. It was the only magazine in Smederevo that was independent during the rule of Slobodan Milošević. The magazine slogan was Truth at least once a week (Serbian Cyrillic: Истина бар једном седмично). The word "sedmica" means "seven" in Serbian, but it can also mean a "week".

As the magazine editorial says "Smederevska sedmica was published by staff dedicated to freedom of speech and of the media despite the fact that they operate in a difficult economic and political environment".
