= House of Karađorđević =

Serbian and Yugoslav royal family

House of Karađorđević Династија Карађорђевић
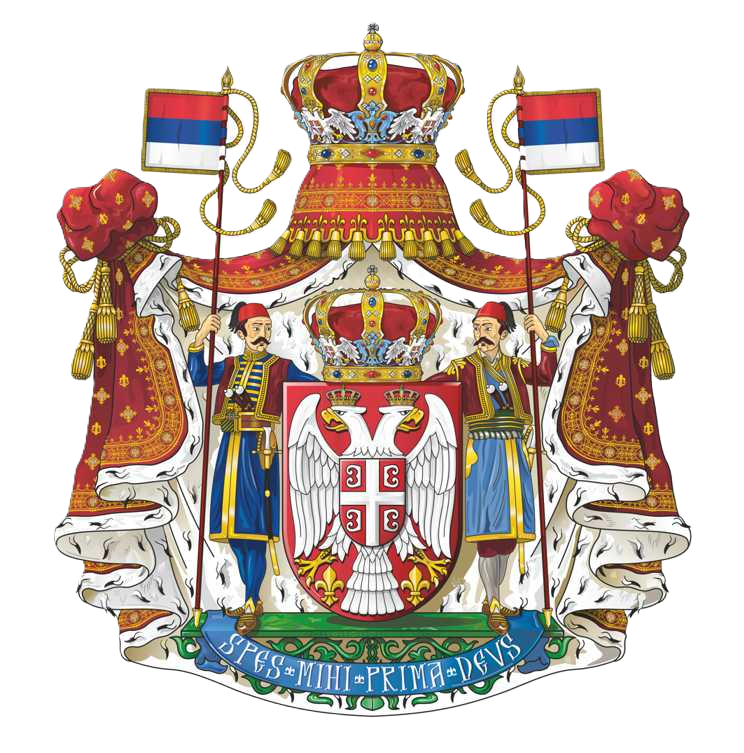
- Great Pavilion Arms of the House of Karađorđević
- Country: Revolutionary Serbia; Principality of Serbia; Kingdom of Serbia; Kingdom of Yugoslavia
- Founded: 14 February 1804; 222 years ago
- Founder: Karađorđe
- Current head: Crown Prince Alexander
- Final ruler: King Peter II
- Titles: Grand Leader of Serbia (1804–1813); Prince of Serbia (1842–1858); King of Serbia (1903–1918); King of Serbs, Croats and Slovenes (1918–1929); King of Yugoslavia (1929–1945)
- Style: Royal Highness
- Estates: Dedinje Royal Compound, Belgrade; Oplenac, Topola
- Deposition: 1945; 81 years ago

The House of Karađorđević or Karađorđević dynasty (Serbian: Династија Карађорђевић, Dinastija Karađorđević, IPA: [karadʑǒːrdʑevitɕ]; pl. Карађорђевићи, Karađorđevići) is the former ruling Serbian and deposed Yugoslav royal family.

The family was founded by Karađorđe Petrović (1768–1817), the Veliki Vožd (Serbian Cyrillic: Велики Вожд, lit. 'Grand Leader') of Serbia during the First Serbian uprising of 1804–1813. In the course of the 19th century the relatively short-lived dynasty was supported by the Russian Empire and was opposed to the Austrian-supported House of Obrenović. The two houses subsequently vied for the throne for several generations.

Following the assassination of the Obrenović King Alexander I of Serbia in 1903, the Serbian Parliament chose Karađorđe's grandson, Peter I Karađorđević, then living in exile, to occupy the throne of the Kingdom of Serbia. He was duly crowned as King Peter I, and shortly before the end of World War I in 1918, representatives of the three peoples proclaimed a Kingdom of the Serbs, Croats and Slovenes with Peter I as sovereign. In 1929, the kingdom was renamed Yugoslavia, under Alexander I, the son of Peter I. In November 1945 the family lost their throne when the League of Communists of Yugoslavia seized power during the reign of Peter II.

During its existence, the dynasty intermarried with royal houses of Petrović-Njegoš, Romanov, Hohenzollern, Oldenburg, Baden, Hesse, Leiningen, Savoy, Liechtenstein and Orléans.

== Name ==
In English, the family name can be anglicized as Karageorgevitch (e.g., as with Prince Bojidar Karageorgevitch and Prince Philip Karageorgevitch) or romanised as Karadjordjevic. Its origin is as a patronym of the sobriquet Karađorđe, bestowed upon the family's founder, Đorđe Petrović, at the end of the 18th century.

In 1796, Osman Pazvantoğlu, the renegade governor of the Ottoman Sanjak of Vidin, who had rejected the authority of the Sublime Porte, launched an invasion of the Pashalik of Belgrade, governed by Hadji Mustafa Pasha since 1793. Overwhelmed, Mustafa Pasha formed a Serbian national militia to help stop the incursion. Đorđe Petrović joined the militia and became a boluk-bashi (Serbian: Buljukbaša), (Note: Boluk-bashi was equivalent to the rank of captain.) leading a company of 100 men. After the Serb militias joined the war on Mustafa Pasha's side, Pazvantoğlu suffered a string of defeats. He retreated to Vidin, which was subsequently besieged. The war against Pazvantoğlu marked the first time that Petrović had distinguished himself in the eyes of the Ottomans, who bestowed upon him the sobriquet "Black George" (Serbian: Karađorđe; Turkish: Kara Yorgi), partly because of his dark hair and partly because of his sinister reputation.

== Ancestry ==
According to some researchers, Karađorđe's paternal ancestors most likely migrated from the Highlands (in what is today Montenegro) to Šumadija during the Second Great Serb Migration in 1737–1739 under the leadership of Patriarch Šakabenta, as a result of the Austro-Turkish War (in which Serbs took part). Serbian historiography accepted the theory that Karađorđe's ancestors came from Vasojevići.

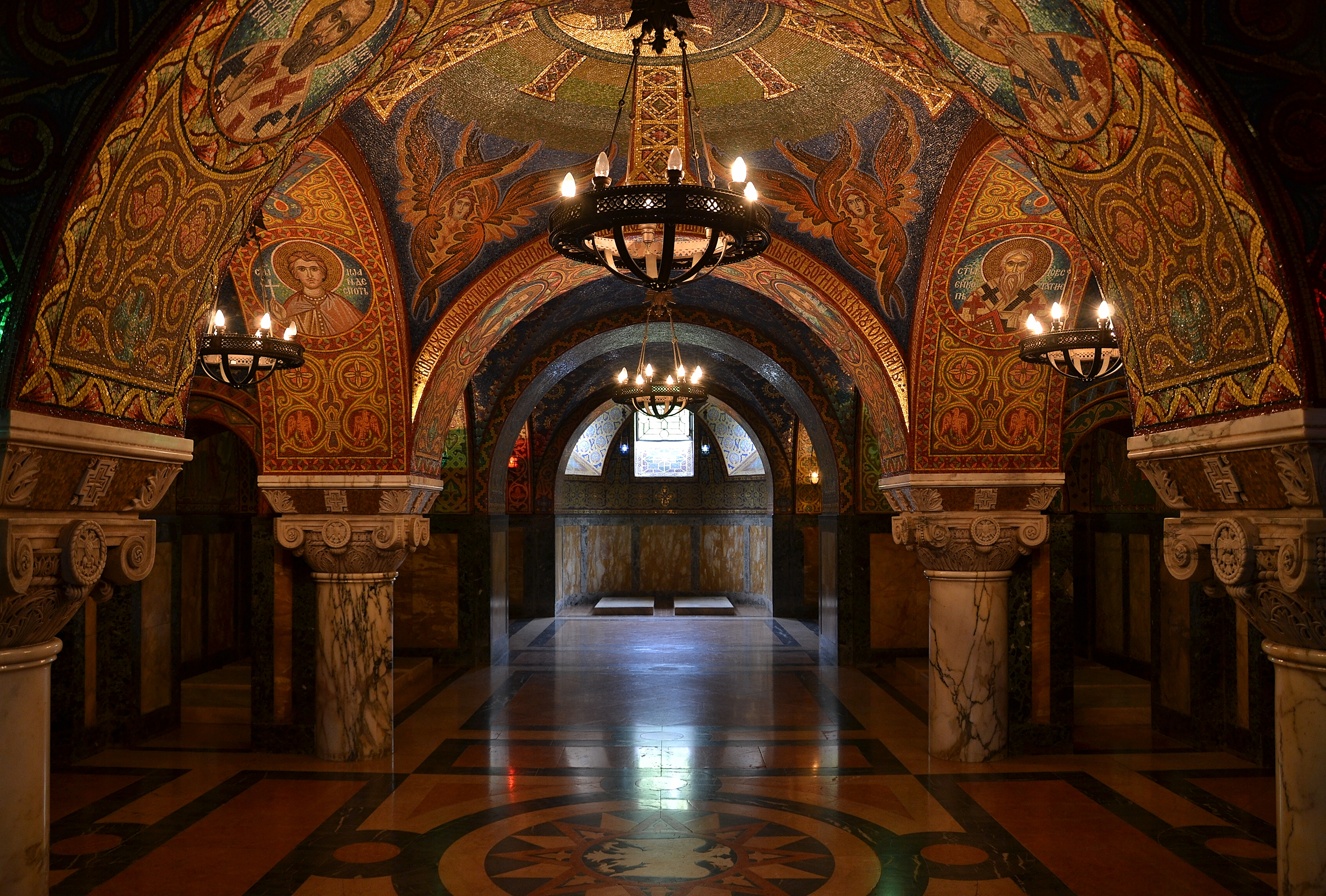
Oplenac, the mausoleum of the Karađorđević dynasty

Some conjecture has arisen about where the family ended up after arriving in Šumadija. According to Radoš Ljušić, Karađorđe's ancestors most likely hailed from Vasojevići, but he has said there is no certain historical information on Karađorđe's ancestors or where they came from, folklore being the only real source. Most likely, Karađorđe's ancestors hailed from Vasojevići. Grigorije Božović (1880–1945) claimed that the family were Srbljaci (natives) in Vasojevići territory. Contributing to Srbljak theory is the fact that the family celebrated St Clement as their Slava until 1890, while the patron saint of Vasojevići, i.e. Vaso's descendants, is Archangel Michael. King Peter I was allowed to change his Slava to St. Andrew the First-called by Belgrade Metropolitan Mihailo in 1890, following the death of his wife, Princess Zorka, thus honoring the date on the Julian calendar when Serbian rebels liberated Belgrade during the First Serbian Uprising.

Furthermore, King Peter chose Voivode of Vasojevići Miljan Vukov Vešović to be his bridesman during his wedding to princess Zorka in 1883. Upon being asked by his future father-in-law prince Nicholas why he chose Miljan amongst various Voivodes of Montenegro, he replied that he chose him because of heroism and relation describing him as Vojvode of my own blood and kin. His son, Alexander, who was born in Cetinje was nicknamed Montenegrin. The Vasojevići tribe claim descent from Stefan Konstantin of the Nemanjić dynasty. The Vasojevići were proud of Karađorđe, and saw him as their kinsman. Montenegrin politician and Vasojević Gavro Vuković, supported this theory. Accordingly, Alexander Karađorđević (1806–1885) was given the title "Voivode of Vasojevići" by Petar II in 1840. Other theories include: Montenegrin historian Miomir Dašić claimed that Karađorđe's family originated from the Gurešići from Podgorica in Montenegro. Folklorist Dragutin Vuković believed that Tripko Knežević–Guriš was Karađorđe's great-grandfather; Vukićević, writing in 1907, said that in the surroundings of Podgorica, there is a local claim that Karađorđe's ancestors initially came from Vranj.

The family claimed descent from the Vasojevići tribe (in Montenegro) and had emigrated in the late 1730s or early 1740s. The family lived in Mačitevo (in Suva Reka), from where grandfather Jovan moved to Viševac, while Jovan's brother Radak moved to Mramorac.

== List of monarchs ==
Picture	Title Name	Birth	Reign	Spouse	Death	Claim	Notes
	^{Grand Vožd of Serbia} Karađorđe	16 November [O.S. 5 November] 1768; Viševac, Sanjak of Smederevo, Rumelia Eyalet, Ottoman Empire	15 February 1804 – 21 September 1813 (9 years, 218 days)	Jelena Jovanović	26 July [O.S. 14 July] 1817; Radovanje Grove, Sanjak of Smederevo, Rumelia Eyalet, Ottoman Empire (aged 48)	Leader of the First Serbian uprising	Deposed and exiled to Austria.
Out of power for 28 years, 358 days.
	^{Prince of Serbia} Alexander	11 October 1806; Topola, Revolutionary Serbia	14 September 1842 – 23 December 1858 (16 years, 100 days)	Persida Nenadović	3 May 1885; Timișoara, Austria-Hungary (aged 78)	Elected by the National Assembly. Son of Karađorđe Petrović and Jelena Jovanović	Abdicated.
Out of power for 44 years, 174 days.
	^{King of Serbia;}^{King of Serbs, Croats and Slovenes} Peter I	11 July [O.S. 29 June] 1844; Belgrade, Serbia	15 June 1903 – 16 August 1921 (18 years, 62 days)	Zorka of Montenegro	16 August 1921; Belgrade, Kingdom of Serbs, Croats and Slovenes (aged 77)	Elected by the National Assembly. Son of Alexander and Persida Nenadović	In exile from November 1915 due to the Serbian Campaign. Proclaimed King of Serbs, Croats and Slovenes in 1918.
	^{King of Serbs, Croats and Slovenes;}^{King of Yugoslavia} Alexander I	16 December 1888; Cetinje, Montenegro	16 August 1921 – 9 October 1934 (13 years, 54 days)	Maria of Romania	9 October 1934; Marseille, France (aged 45)	Son of Peter I and Zorka of Montenegro	Changed title to "King of Yugoslavia" in 1929. Assassinated in Marseille.
	^{Prince regent of Yugoslavia} Paul	27 April 1893; Saint Petersburg, Russian Empire	9 October 1934 – 27 March 1941 (6 years, 169 days)	Olga of Greece and Denmark	14 September 1976; Paris, France (aged 83)	The Will of Alexander I	Prince Paul acted as prince regent for Peter II until ousted in March 1941.
	^{King of Yugoslavia} Peter II	6 September 1923; Belgrade, Kingdom of Serbs, Croats and Slovenes	9 October 1934 – 29 November 1945 (11 years, 51 days)	Alexandra of Greece and Denmark	3 November 1970; Denver, Colorado, U.S. (aged 47)	Son of Alexander I and Maria of Romania	Prince Paul acted as prince regent for Peter II until ousted in March 1941.
	^{King of Yugoslavia} Peter II	6 September 1923; Belgrade, Kingdom of Serbs, Croats and Slovenes	9 October 1934 – 29 November 1945 (11 years, 51 days)	Alexandra of Greece and Denmark	3 November 1970; Denver, Colorado, U.S. (aged 47)	Son of Alexander I and Maria of Romania	Exiled in April 1941, and deposed in 1945.

== Heads of the House since 1945 ==
The Karađorđevići are active in Serbian society in various ways. There is a view that constitutional parliamentary monarchy would be the ultimate solution for stability, unity, and continuity in Serbia. In addition, the family supports Serbia as a democratic country with a future in the European Union.

The last crown prince of Yugoslavia, Alexander, has lived in Belgrade at the Dedinje Royal Palace since 2001. As the only son of the last king, Peter II, who never abdicated, and the last official heir of the Kingdom of Yugoslavia he claims to be the rightful heir to the Serbian throne in the event of restoration. At the palace, Alexander regularly receives religious leaders and strives, as opportunity permits, to demonstrate his commitment to human rights and to democracy. The family are also much engaged in humanitarian work. Crown Princess Katherine has a humanitarian foundation while Crown Prince Alexander heads the Foundation for Culture and Education, whose activities include student scholarships, and summer camps for children.

On 27 April 2022, Prince Peter Karageorgevitch renounced his title of Hereditary prince – for himself and his descendants – and his younger brother Prince Philip became their father's heir apparent. The ceremony took place at Casa de Pilatos in Seville, Spain. Present were Peter's and Philip's mother Princess Maria Da Gloria of Orléans-Braganza, Duchess of Segorbe and their stepfather Ignacio, 19th Duke of Segorbe; Philip's wife Princess Danica; their half-sister Sol, Countess of Ampurias; Ljubodrag Grujić, a member of the Crown Council and Chancellor of the Orders and Herald of the House of Karađorđević; and Nikola Stanković, Chief of Staff of the Crown Prince.

Picture	Name	Birth	Tenure	Marriage(s), issue	Death	Claim
	Peter II	6 September 1923; Belgrade, Kingdom of Serbs, Croats and Slovenes	29 November 1945 – 3 November 1970 (24 years, 339 days)	Alexandra of Greece and Denmark; 20 March 1944; 1 son	3 November 1970; Denver, Colorado, U.S. (aged 47)	Deposed king of Yugoslavia
	Crown Prince Alexander (Alexander II)	17 July 1945; Claridge's, Mayfair, London (Note: See paragraph one of "Birth and childhood") (age 81)	3 November 1970 – present (56 years, 5 days)	Maria da Gloria of Orléans-Bragança; 1 July 1972 – 19 February 1985; 3 sons Katherine Batis; 20 September 1985; No children		Son of Peter II and Alexandra of Greece and Denmark

List of heirs

- Crown Prince Alexander (29 November 1945 – 3 November 1970), Son of King Peter II
- Prince Tomislav (3 November 1970 – 5 February 1980), 2nd son of King Alexander I
- Prince Peter (5 February 1980 – 27 April 2022), 1st son of Crown Prince Alexander
- Prince Philip (27 April 2022 – present), 2nd son of Crown Prince Alexander

== Serbia and Yugoslavia ==
The Karađorđević family initially was a Serbian Royal House, then the Royal House of the Serbs, Croats and Slovenes and then the Royal House of Yugoslavia. When they last reigned they were called the Royal House of Yugoslavia.

According to legend, Crown Prince Alexander was born in London but on property temporarily recognized by the United Kingdom's government as subject to the sovereignty of the Yugoslav crown, on which occasion it was publicly declared that the Crown Prince had been born on the native soil of the land he was expected to eventually rule. However, the story is likely apocryphal as it would have required legal measures such as an act of Parliament, for which there is no documentary record.

=== Heraldry ===
Coat of arms of Serbia

Coat of arms of Yugoslavia

== Male descendants of Karađorđe ==
The list below includes male members of the Karađorđević dynasty. Bold denotes the current head of the House. Number in parentheses indicates the order of line of Succession to the throne, as of April 2022. The order of line of Succession is not official.

- Grand Leader Karađorđe (1768–1817)
  - Alexis (1801–1830)
    - George (1827–1884)
      - Prince Alexis (1859–1920)
      - Prince Bojidar (1862–1908)
  - Prince Alexander (1806–1885)
    - Alexis (1836–1841)
    - Hereditary Prince Svetozar (1841–1847)
    - King Peter I (1844–1921)
      - Prince George (1887–1972)
      - King Alexander I (1888–1934)
        - King Peter II (1923–1970)
          - **Crown Prince Alexander** (b. 1945)
            - Prince Peter (b. 1980) (Note: See paragraph three of "Public life")
            - **(1)** Hereditary Prince Philip (b. 1982)
              - **(2)** Prince Stephen (b. 2018)
            - **(3)** Prince Alexander (b. 1982)
              - **(4)** Prince Marko Alexander (b. 2026)
        - Prince Tomislav (1928–2000)
          - **(5)** Prince Nicholas (b. 1958)
          - **(6)** Prince George (b. 1984)
          - **(7)** Prince Michael (b. 1985)
        - Prince Andrew (1929–1990)
          - Prince Christopher (1960–1994)
          - **(8)** Prince Vladimir (b. 1964)
            - Prince Kirill (2001–2001)
          - **(9)** Prince Dimitri (b. 1965)
      - Prince Andrew (1890–1890)
    - Prince Andrew (1848–1864)
    - Prince George (1856–1889)
    - Prince Arsen (1859–1938)
      - Prince Regent Paul (1893–1976)
        - Prince Alexander (1924–2016)
          - Prince Dimitri (b. 1958)
          - Prince Michael (b. 1958)
          - Prince Sergius (b. 1963)
            - (illegitimate) Umberto (b. 2018)
          - Prince Dushan (b. 1977)
        - Prince Nicholas (1928–1954)

== Armorial ==
Figure	Name of Armiger and Blazon
	Karađorđe, Grand Vozd of Serbia 1804–1814 Sable, the Cyrillic letters Ð and P conjoined Argent Crest: an Arm vested Vert, bent at the elbow, holding a sabre proper, issuing from a Ducal coronet Or
	Alexander Karađorđević, Prince of Serbia 1842–1858, son of Ðorđe Petrović Gules, a Cross Argent between four firesteels Argent
	Peter I, King of Serbia 1903–1918, King of the Serbs, Croats and Slovenes 1918–1921, son of Aleksandar Karadjordjevic Arms in exile as Prince up to 1903 Arms as King of Serbia 1903–1918 Arms as King of the Serbs, Croats and Slovenes 1918–1921
	Alexander I, King of the Serbs, Croats and Slovenes 1921–1929, King of Yugoslavia 1929–1934, second son of Petar I
	Peter II, King of Yugoslavia 1934–1945, eldest son of Aleksandar I
	Alexander Karađorđević, Crown Prince of Yugoslavia, only son of Peter II Arms used 1970–2004 (i.e. that of King of Yugoslavia) Arms used 2004–present (i.e. that of King of Serbia)
	Prince Tomislav of Yugoslavia, second son of Alexander I
	Prince Andrej of Yugoslavia, third son of Alexander I
	Prince Paul of Yugoslavia, Prince Regent of Yugoslavia 1934–1941, nephew of Peter I Arms borne 1934–1976
	Prince Alexander of Yugoslavia, eldest son of Pavle Arms borne 1976–2004 Arms borne 2004–present
	Princess Elizabeth of Yugoslavia, only daughter of Pavle Arms borne 2004–present

== See also ==
- List of heads of former ruling families

== Sources and further reading ==
- Jelavich, Charles; Jelavich, Barbara (2000). The Establishment of the Balkan National States, 1804–1920. Vol. 8 (4th ed.). Seattle, Washington: University of Washington Press. ISBN 978-0-29580-360-9.
- Kanitz, Felix Phillip (1987). Srbija: zemlja i stanovništvo od rimskog doba do kraja XIX veka, Volume 1 (3rd ed.). Srpska književna zadruga.
- Király, Béla K.; Rothenberg, Gunther E. (1982). War and Society in East Central Europe: The first Serbian uprising 1804-1813. Brooklyn College Press. ISBN 978-0-930888-15-2.
- Pavlowitch, Stevan K. (2002). Serbia: The History of an Idea. New York: New York University Press. ISBN 978-0-8147-6708-5.
- Rehm, Brendon A. (1992). "Karageorge". In Dupuy, Trevor Nevitt; Johnson, Curt; Bongard, David L. (eds.). The Harper Encyclopedia of Military Biography. New York: Harper Collins. p. 392. ISBN 978-0-78580-437-6.
- Singleton, Frederick Bernard (1985). A Short History of the Yugoslav Peoples. New York: Cambridge University Press. ISBN 978-0-521-27485-2.
- Skrivanić, Gavro (1982). "The Armed Forces in Karadjordje's Serbia". In Vucinich, Wayne S. (ed.). The First Serbian Uprising, 1804–1813. War and Society in East Central Europe. New York: Columbia University Press. pp. 303–340. ISBN 978-0-930888-15-2.
- Vukićević, Milenko M. (1907). Karađorđe: 1752–1804. Štampano u Državnoj štampariji Kraljevine Srbije.
- Vuković, Gavro (1985). Slobodan Tomović (ed.). Memoari, Volume 2. Obod.
