= Prince Alexander of Yugoslavia (born 1982) =

Member of the House of Karađorđević

Alexander of Serbia and Yugoslavia
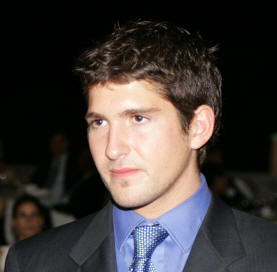
- Prince Alexander in 2011
- Born: 15 January 1982 (age 44); Vienna, Virginia, United States
- Spouse: Vesna Jelić (m. 2025)
- Issue: Prince Marko Aleksandar
- House: Karađorđević
- Father: Alexander, Crown Prince of Yugoslavia
- Mother: Princess Maria da Gloria of Orléans-Braganza
- Religion: Serbian Orthodox

Alexander Karageorgevitch (Serbian Cyrillic: Александар Карађорђевић, romanized: Aleksandar Karađorđević; born 15 January 1982), also known as Prince Alexander of Serbia and Yugoslavia or Prince Aleksandar III Karađorđević, is a member of the House of Karađorđević, the former ruling family of the defunct Kingdom of Yugoslavia. He is the third and youngest grandchild of the last Yugoslav king, Peter II.

== Early life and education ==
Prince Alexander was born 15 January 1982 in Vienna, Virginia, Alexander is the third and youngest child of the last crown prince of Yugoslavia, Alexander, and his first wife, Princess Maria da Gloria of Orléans-Braganza. He is the fraternal twin of Philip. His godparents are Queen Sofía of Spain, King Constantine II of Greece (first cousins of his father), and Princess Anne, Duchess of Calabria (first cousin of his mother). Besides his twin brother, he has an older brother, Peter (b. 1980). Alexander lived in Virginia until 1984. In 1982, Alexander and his twin brother were baptized by Lavrentije, Serbian Orthodox Bishop of Western Europe, at a castle in Villamanrique de la Condesa, near Seville, Spain.

Alexander's parents divorced in 1985. After the divorce, his father married Katherine Clairy Batis later that year, while his mother married Ignacio, 19th Duke of Segorbe in the same year. Through his mother, Alexander has two younger half-sisters, Sol María de la Blanca Medina y Orléans-Braganza, 54th Countess of Ampurias (b. 1986) and Ana Luna Medina y Orléans-Braganza, 17th Countess of Ricla (b. 1988).

Alexander was educated in London and Canterbury with his twin brother. In June 2000, he completed sixth form at The King's School, Canterbury. He was awarded a BA degree in Communications and Media from the University of San Francisco in 2004. Alexander was at a graduate school at an American university completing a MFA degree in advertising (Art Direction).

He resided in Hawaii.

== Patronages ==
In Serbia he is Chairman of the Board of Directors of the Crown Prince Foundation for Education and Culture (since 2024).

== Personal life ==
Prince Alexander attended the reburial of his grandparents King Peter II and Queen Alexandra, great-grandmother Queen Maria, and granduncle Prince Andrew in the Royal Family Mausoleum at Oplenac on 26 May 2013. The Serbian Royal Regalia were placed over King Peter's coffin, having Alexander placing a diamond sabre near to the Karađorđević Crown.

In 2015, Alexander dated Dunja Kusturica, a daughter of Serbian filmmaker and musician Emir Kusturica. At the time, their relationship was compared to one of Catherine and Prince William by Serbian media. In 2015, he owned a bar in Belgrade. On 17 July 2015, Prince Alexander and his brothers were present at their father's 70th birthday celebration in Belgrade. The event gathered 400 guests, including Carl XVI Gustaf of Sweden and Albert II of Monaco among others.

== Marriage ==
On 6 September 2025, he married civilly to Vesna Jelić at the Royal Palace in Belgrade. On 20 September 2025, they entered into a religious marriage at the parish church of St. Mary Magdalene in Villamanrique de la Condesa. She was born in Munich on 12 December 1985 and is the daughter of Marko Jelić and his wife, Slavica. On 13 October 2026 they welcomed a son, Prince Marko Aleksandar, in Belgrade.
