= Prince Peter of Yugoslavia =

Member of the House of Karađorđević

Prince Peter
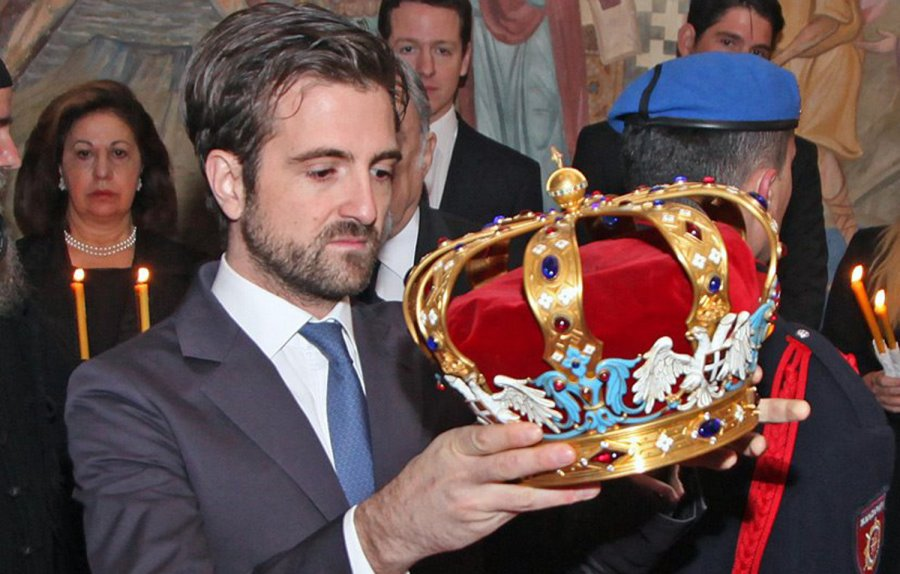
- Prince Peter holding the Karađorđević Crown in 2013
- Born: 5 February 1980 (age 46); Chicago, Illinois, United States
- Issue: Dolores Luna Noor Karađorđević
- House: Karađorđević
- Father: Alexander, Crown Prince of Yugoslavia
- Mother: Princess Maria da Gloria of Orléans-Braganza
- Occupation: Graphic designer

Peter Karageorgevitch (Serbian Cyrillic: Петар Карађорђевић, romanized: Petar Karađorđević; born 5 February 1980), also known as Prince Peter of Serbia and Yugoslavia, is an American born Spanish-Serbian graphic designer and a member of the House of Karađorđević. He is the oldest grandchild and the first grandson of the last Yugoslav king, Peter II. Between his birth and his renunciation in 2022, he was known as the Hereditary Prince.

== Early life and education ==
Peter is the first son and the oldest child of the last Crown Prince of the former Kingdom of Yugoslavia, Alexander, and Princess Maria da Gloria of Orléans-Braganza. He was born at Prentice Women's Hospital in Chicago and lived there until the end of 1981, when he moved with his parents to Virginia. In 1983, he first attended morning pre-school in Tysons Corner, Virginia, and in 1984, he went to day school. His godfather was Prince Alexander of Yugoslavia, a son of Prince Paul of Yugoslavia. His godmother is Anne, Princess Royal. Peter has two younger brothers, twins Philip and Alexander (born 1982).

Peter's parents divorced in 1985. After the divorce, his father married Katherine Clairy Batis later that year, while his mother married Ignacio, Duke of Segorbe later that year also. Through his mother, Peter has two younger half-sisters, Sol María de la Blanca Medina y Orléans-Braganza, Countess of Ampurias (b. 1986) and Ana Luna Medina y Orléans-Braganza, Countess of Ricla (b. 1988).

In 1991, Peter with his father and brothers briefly visited Belgrade, Yugoslavia. In February 2001, the Parliament of FR Yugoslavia passed legislation conferring citizenship on members of the Karađorđević family, making Peter eligible for a Yugoslav citizenship. In July 2001, his father and step-mother moved to Belgrade, Serbia, FR Yugoslavia.

In June 1998, Peter graduated from The King's School, Canterbury, in England, having obtained three A-levels in Art, Spanish, and French, and ten GCSEs. In 1999, he completed in London an art foundation course at Camberwell College of Arts (London Institute). He spent the 1999–2000 year at the Rhode Island School of Design (RISD). In May 2000, he concluded a series of art programs on the European continent mainly in Barcelona and Seville, Spain.

== Public life ==
Prince Peter attended the reburial of his grandparents King Peter II and Queen Alexandra, great-grandmother Queen Maria, and great-uncle Prince Andrew in the Royal Family Mausoleum at Oplenac on 26 May 2013. The Serbian Royal Regalia were placed over King Peter's coffin, having Peter placing the Karađorđević Crown.

On 17 July 2015, Prince Peter and his brothers were present at their father's 70th birthday celebration in Belgrade. The event gathered 400 guests, including Carl XVI Gustaf of Sweden and Albert II of Monaco among others.

On 27 April 2022, Prince Peter renounced his title of hereditary prince – for himself and his descendants – in favor of his younger brother Philip. The ceremony took place in Seville at Casa de Pilatos in the presence of his mother, Princess Maria da Gloria; his stepfather, the 19th Duke of Segorbe; his brother Philip; his sister-in-law Danica; his half sister the 54th Countess of Ampurias; Ljubodrag Grujić, member of the Crown Council, Chancellor of the Orders and the Herald of the House of Karađorđević; and Nikola Stanković, Chief of Staff of the Crown Prince. His father, Crown Prince Alexander, did not attend the event, and was dissatisfied with Peter's renunciation.

== Personal life ==
Prince Peter used to work in a field of graphic design and art direction in London and New York City. In 2009, he moved to New York and later moved to Seville. He is currently based in London.

Peter has a daughter named Dolores Luna Noor born in 2017 by Lauren Estelle Jones (b. 1984).

== Honours ==
- (Kingdom of Yugoslavia) House of Karađorđević: Knight Grand Collar of the Royal Order of Saint Prince Lazarus
- (Kingdom of Yugoslavia) House of Karađorđević: Knight Grand Cross of the Royal Order of the Star of Karađorđe.
- (Kingdom of Yugoslavia) House of Karađorđević: Knight Grand Cross of the Royal Order of the White Eagle
- (Kingdom of Yugoslavia) House of Karađorđević: Knight Grand Cross of the Royal Order of the Crown
- (Kingdom of Yugoslavia) House of Karađorđević: Knight Grand Cross of the Royal Order of St. Sava

Prince Peter of Yugoslavia House of Karađorđević Born: 5 February 1980
Titles in pretence
Preceded by Prince Tomislav of Yugoslavia	— TITULAR — Hereditary Prince of Serbia and Yugoslavia; 1980–2022	Succeeded by Prince Philip
