= Regalia of Serbia =

Serbian crowns

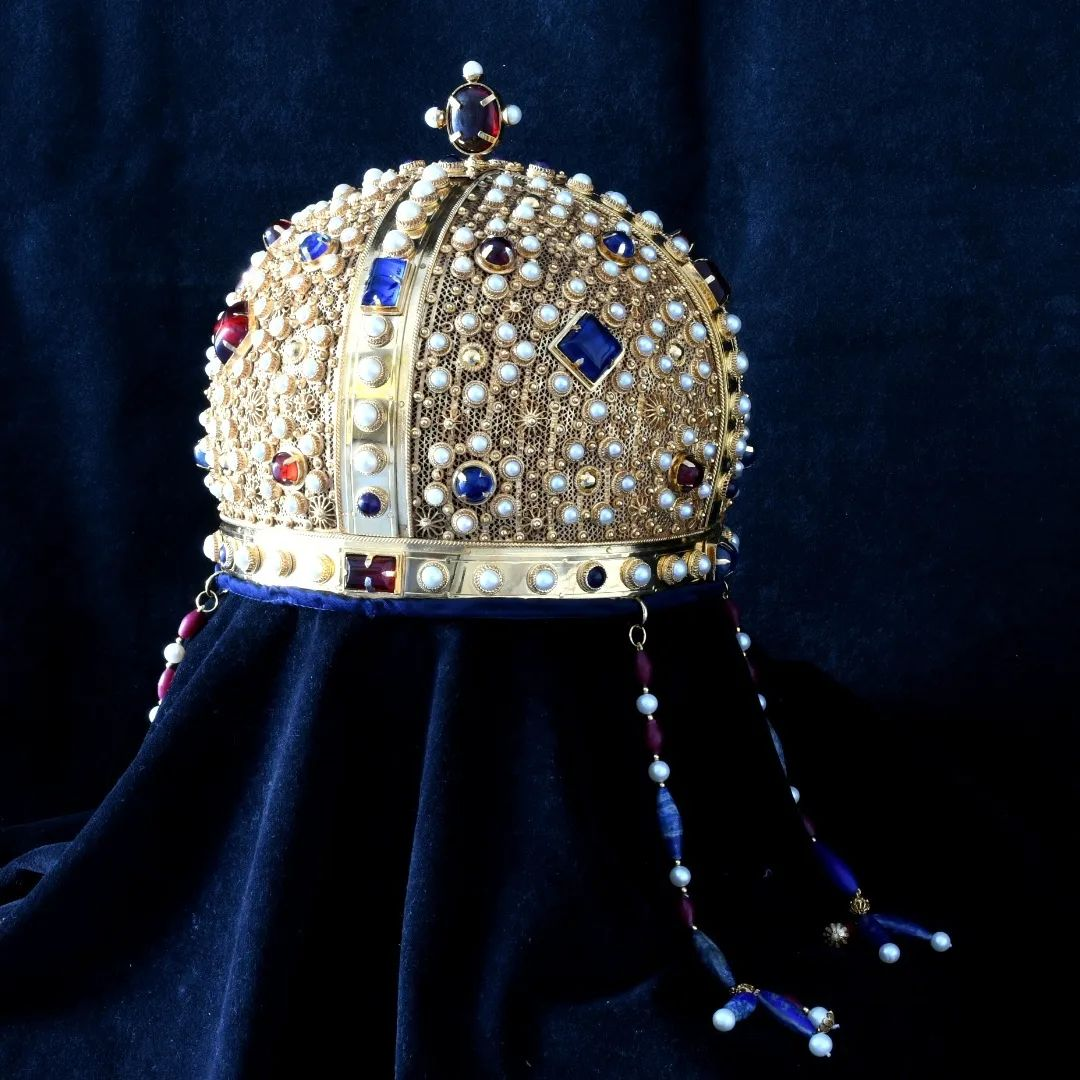
Stefan Dušan, emperor of Serbia Crown

The Royal Crown of Serbia (Serbian: Српска краљевска круна, romanized: Srpska kraljevska kruna) is a royal regalia that existed during the Serbian monarchy.

Serbia, like most former monarchies in Europe, has had crowns once worn by its rulers. The various Serbian principalities and kingdoms were organised around a number of different royal dynasties. Many of these invested in symbols of royalty which has led to a number of distinctive crowns, jewels and other treasures of incredible wealth surviving to the present day.

== Medieval Serbian Crowns ==
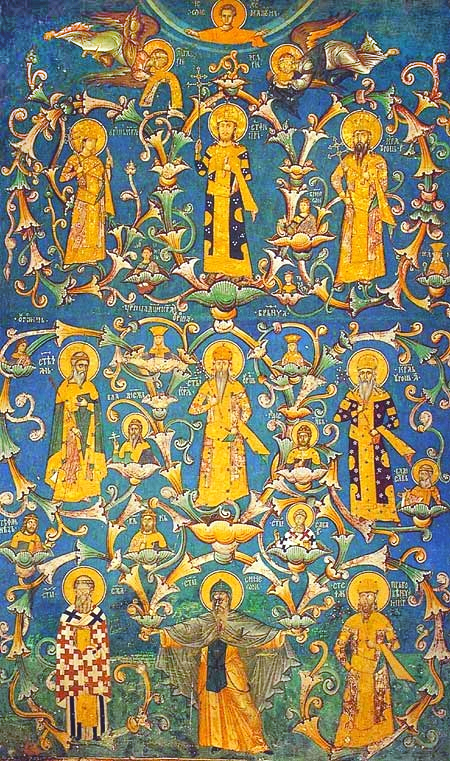
Nemanjić family tree from Visoki Dečani (ca. 1350) depicting rulers wearing crowns

Modern academic research indicates that no physical medieval Serbian royal crown has survived. Knowledge of crowns in medieval Serbia is based primarily on visual and documentary sources, including frescoes, seals, coinage, and royal charters. According to historian Smilja Marjanović-Dušanić, crowns formed part of a broader system of rulership insignia that developed in Serbia between the 13th and 15th centuries. Crown imagery in medieval Serbia shows no single standardized form. Instead, rulers are depicted wearing crowns of varying shapes, often combined with other insignia such as sceptres and Byzantine ceremonial garments. The Serbian system of royal insignia was strongly influenced by Byzantine imperial models, particularly after the establishment of the Serbian Empire in 1346. Crowns functioned primarily as ideological symbols of authority and divine legitimacy, not as permanent material objects.

== Petrović-Njegoš crowns ==
The crown commonly attributed to Stefan Uroš III Dečanski, kept at the Cetinje Monastery in Montenegro, is not a medieval crown but a composite object made from 17th–19th century components. Scientific analysis of its materials and construction shows it was likely assembled around the mid-19th century. Although existing traditions in Montenegro links the crown to the 1910 proclamation of King Nikola I Petrović‑Njegoš, contemporary sources do not report it being used in a coronation. It was an important relic that played a key role in the formation and legalization of the power of King Nikola I. Several crowns (mitres) of this dynasty from the 17th, 18th, and 19th centuries have been preserved to this day and are kept in the treasury of the Cetinje Monastery.

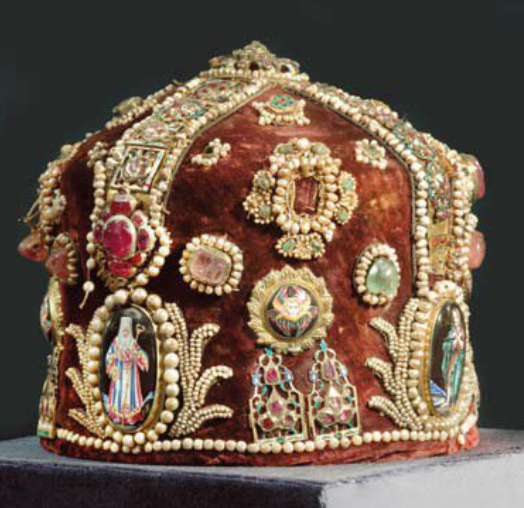
The crown of the Petrović-Njegoš dynasty wrongly attributed to Stefan Dečanski

== Karađorđević Crown ==
The Karađorđević Crown Jewels were created in 1904 for the coronation of King Peter I. The pieces were made from materials that included bronze taken from the cannon Karađorđe used during the First Serbian Uprising. This gesture was symbolic because 1904 was the 100th anniversary of that uprising. The regalia was made in Paris by the famous Falise brothers jewellery company. The crown and the rest of the regalia are in the Historical Museum of Serbia in Belgrade. Until 1904 they were at the altar of the Royal Chapel of St. Andrew the First-Called which is at the Royal Compound in Dedinje. The crown is currently the only Serbian crown kept in Serbia.

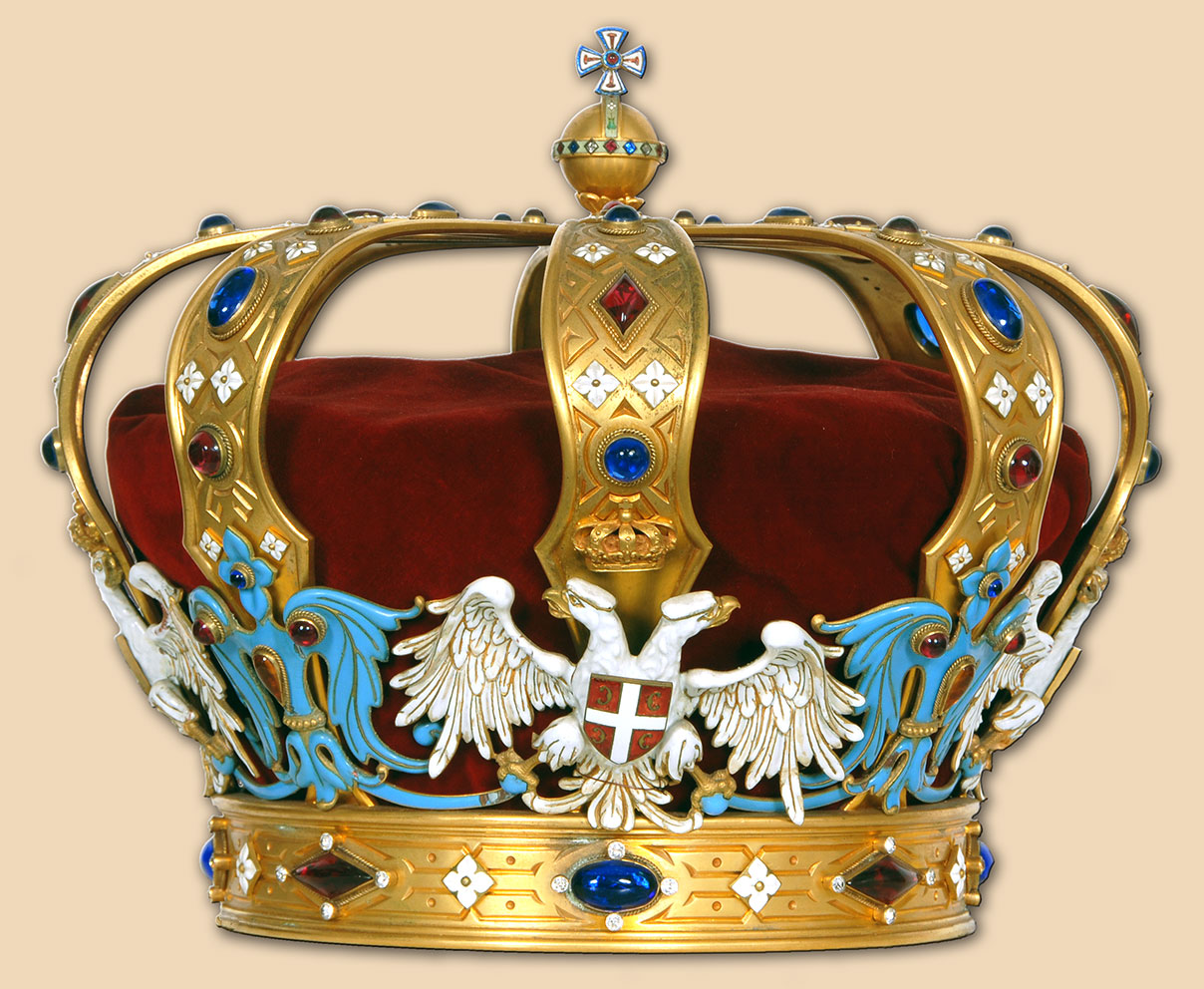
Karađorđević Crown

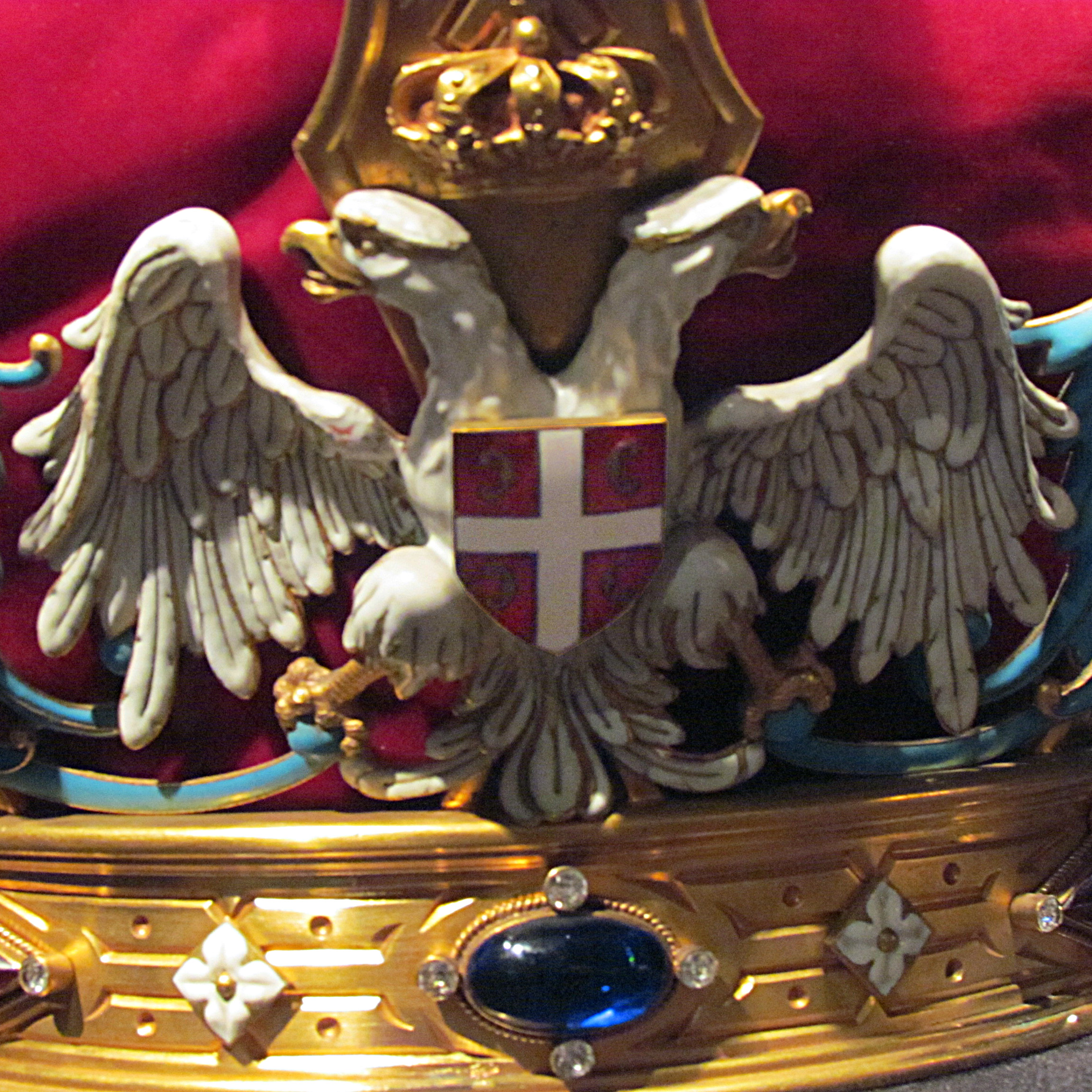
Coat of arms of Serbia on the crown

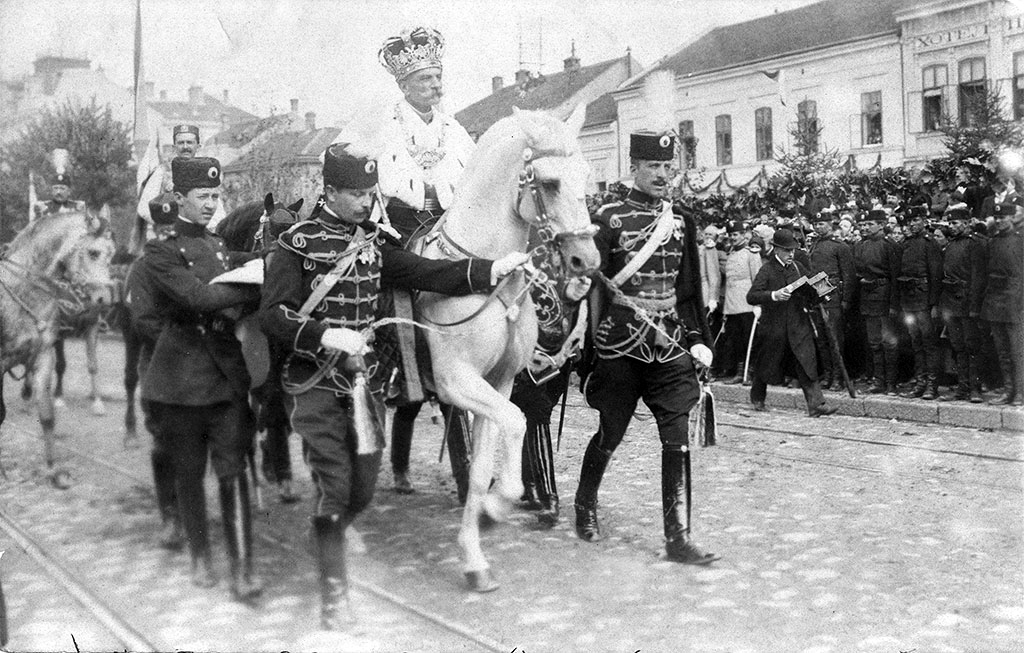
King Peter I wearing the regalia, 1904

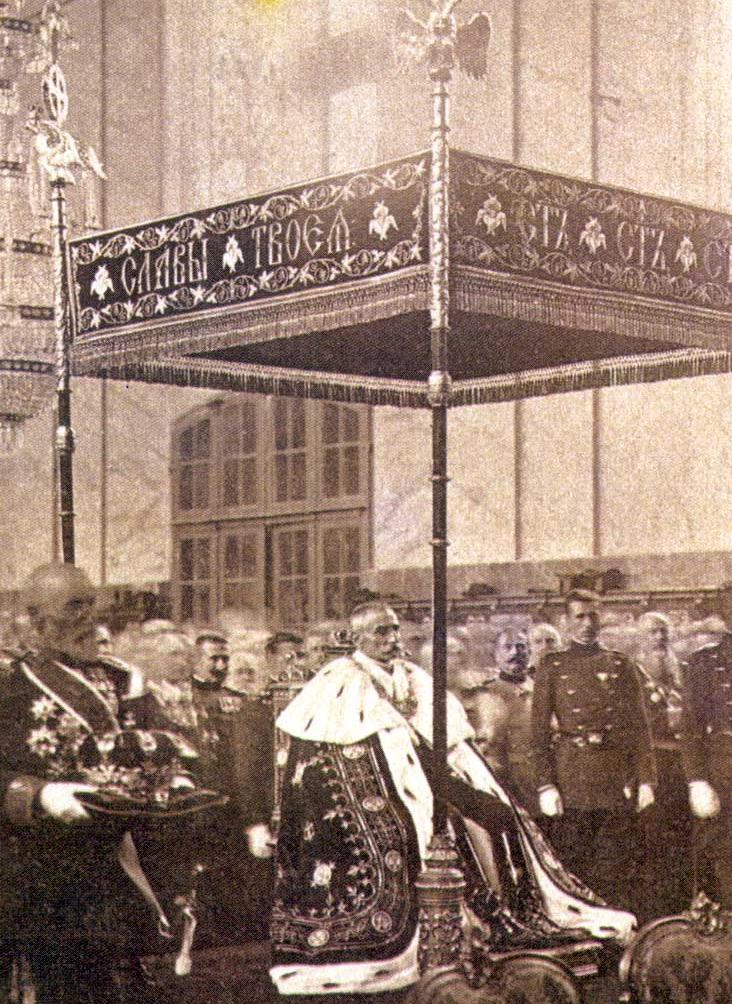
King Peter I's coronation, 1904

Coat of arms of the Kingdom of Serbia

Coat of arms of the Kingdom of Serbs, Croats, and Slovenes / Kingdom of Yugoslavia

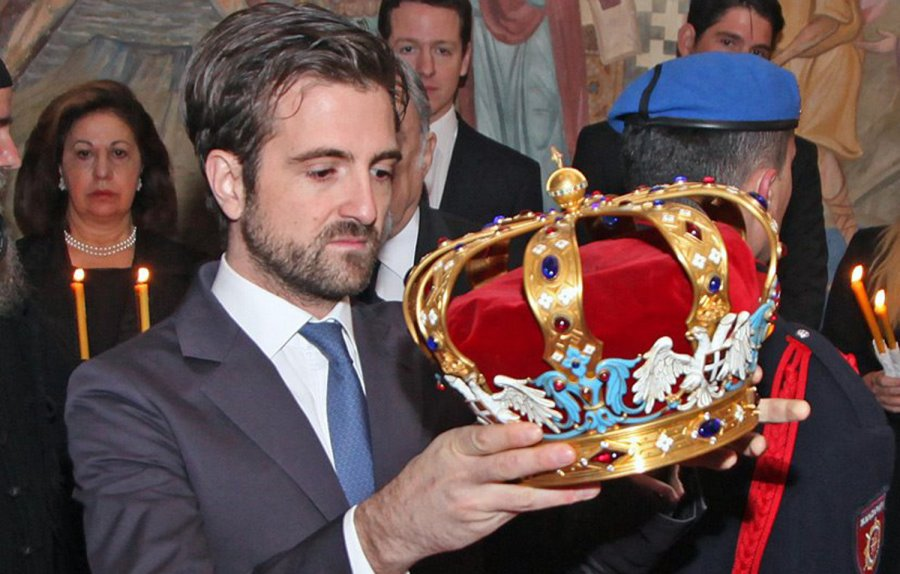
Prince Peter holding the Karađorđević Crown (2013)

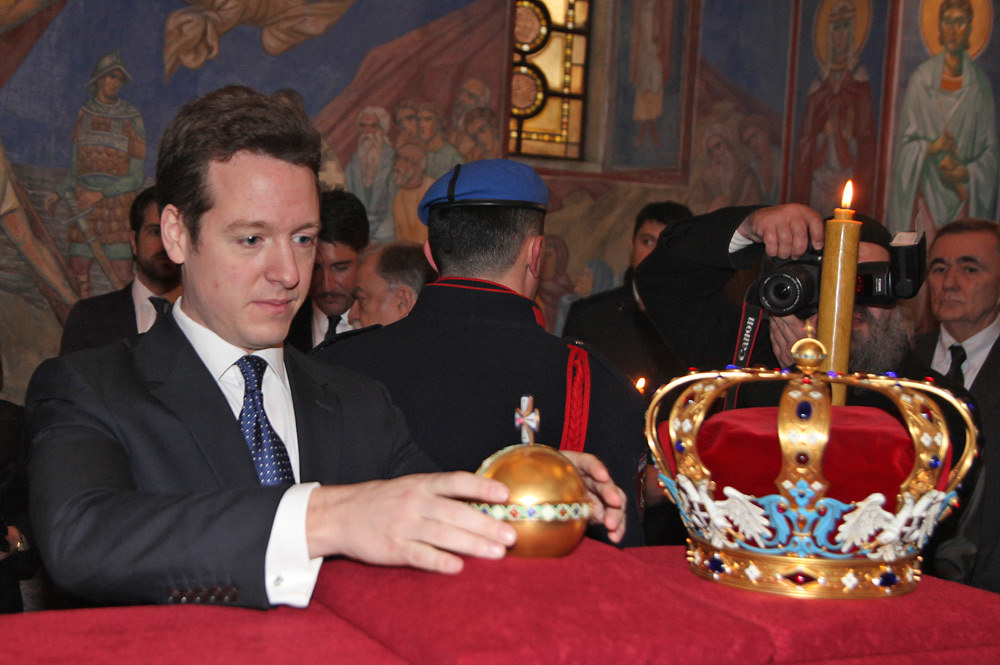
Prince Philip placing the Royal Orb near the Karađorđević Crown, 2013

=== Regalia ===
The Karađorđević Royal Regalia consist of the following:

- Royal crown (Also known as the Karađorđević Crown), with details such as the Serbian coat of arms and monde
- Royal orb
- Royal scepter
- Royal mantle buckle
- Royal mantle

The crown, scepter, and orb are decorated with gemstones found in Serbia and enameled in the national colours of red, blue, and white. The royal mantle is made of purple velvet, embroidered with gold and lined with ermine fur. Unlike in most European countries' regalia, there is no sword of state.

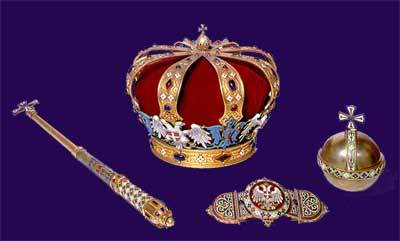
Serbian Crown Jewels, Karađorđević Crown, Royal orb and sceptre, and Royal Mantle buckle

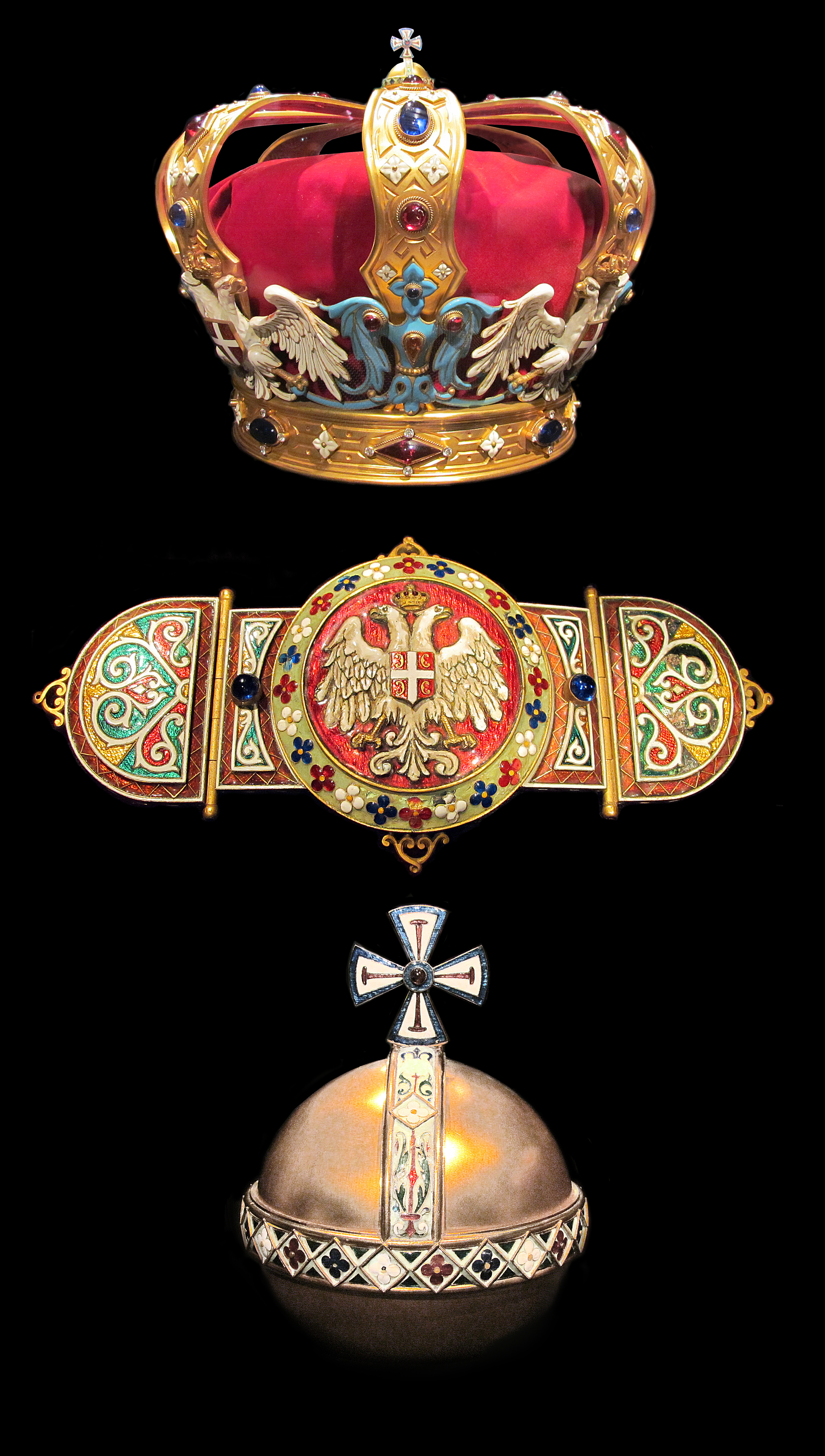
Serbian Crown Jewels, Karađorđević Crown, Royal orb, and Royal Mantle buckle

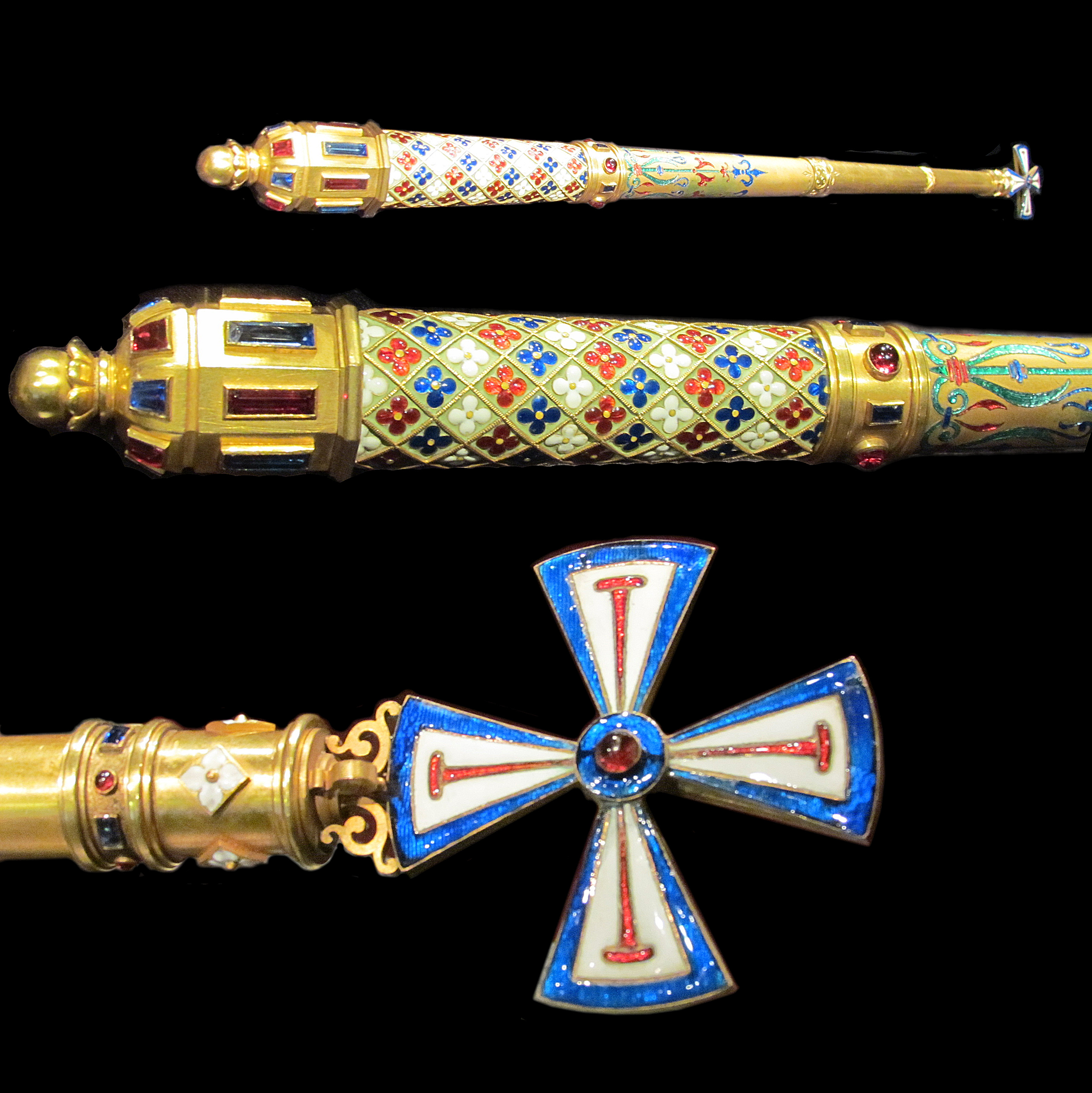
Serbian scepter

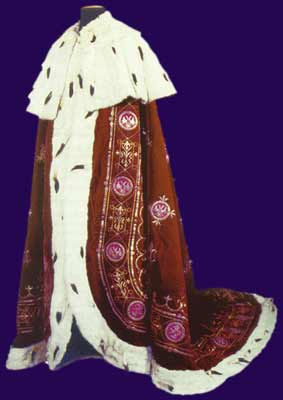
Serbian Royal mantle

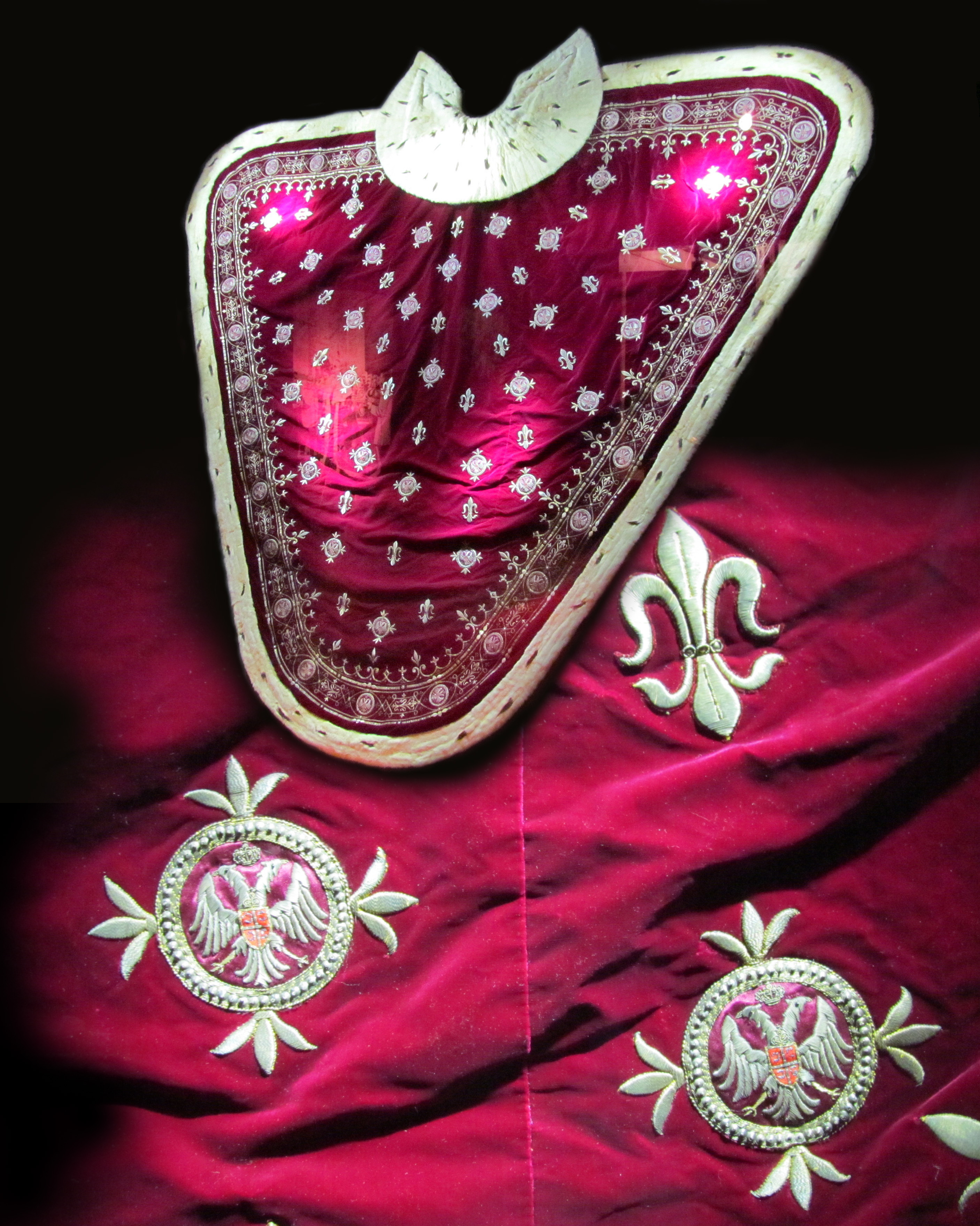
Serbian Royal mantle

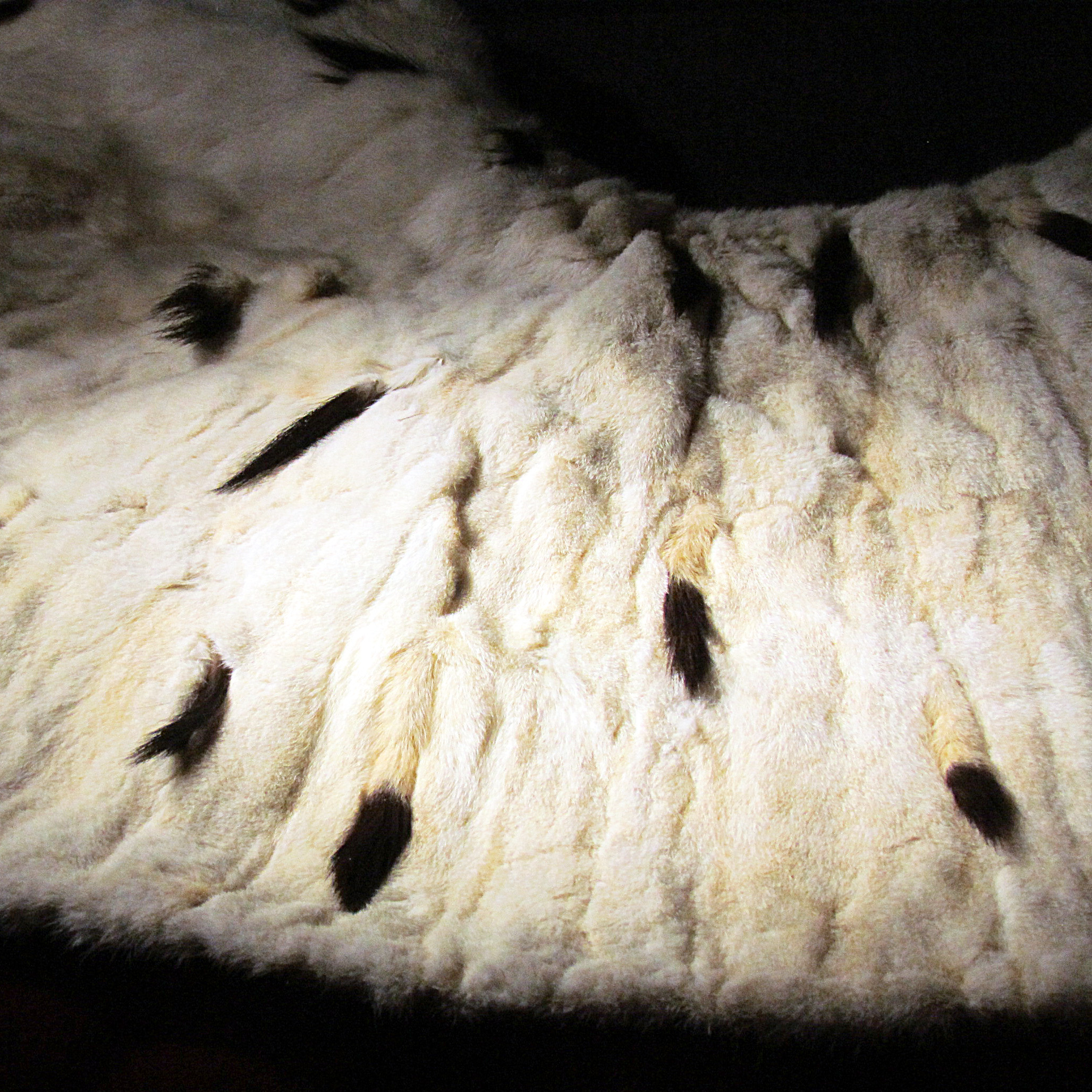
Ermine fur on the Serbian Royal mantle

== Replica Crowns ==
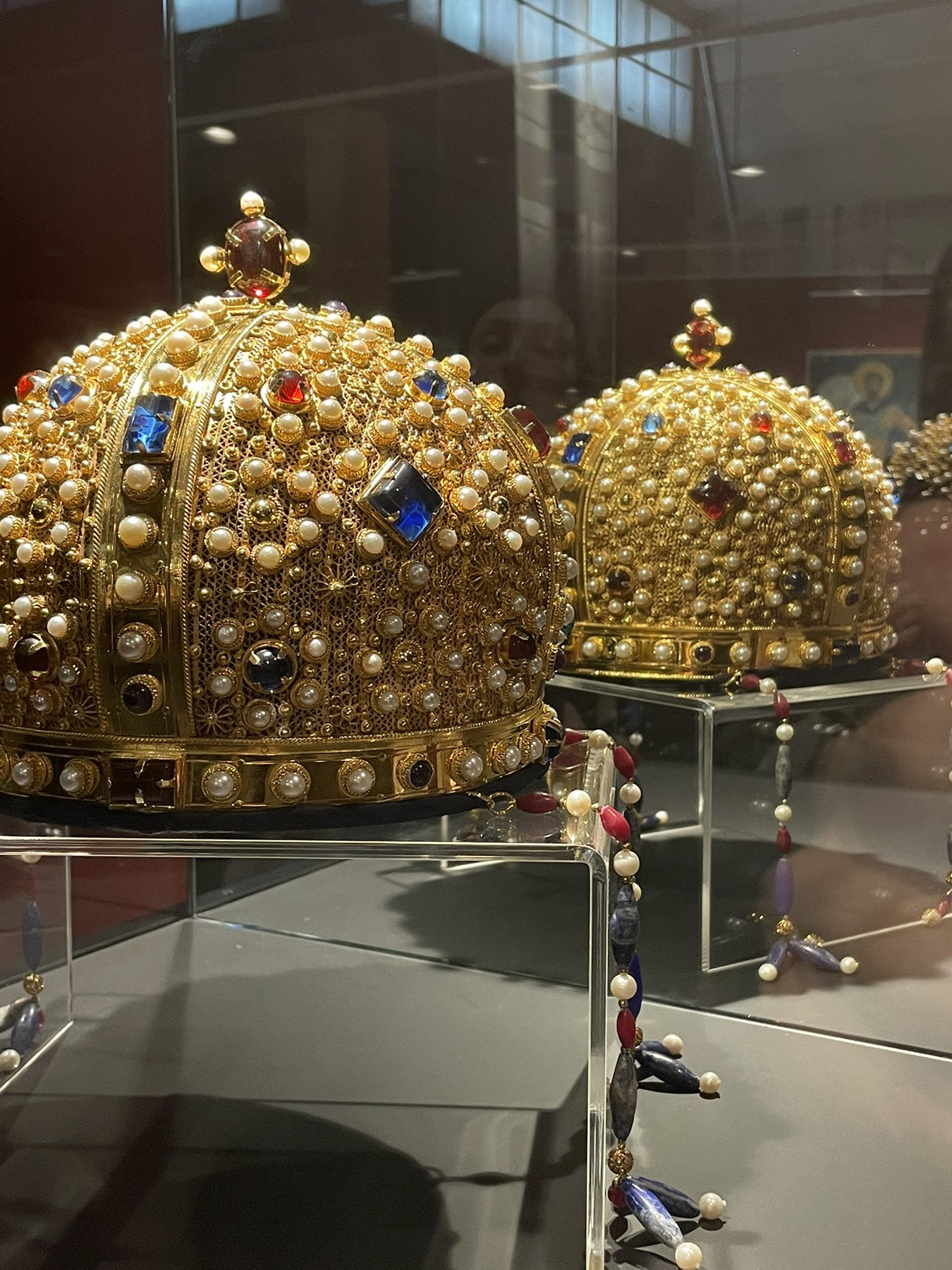
Recreated Crown of Serbian Emperor Stefan Uroš IV Dušan Nemanjić displayed in Historical Museum of Serbia

By the initiative of dr Dušica Bojić, the director of the Historical Museum of Serbia, with the support of the Ministry of Culture of Serbia, several crowns of medieval Serbian rulers were ideally recreated by the filigree artist Goran Ristović Pokimica (co-operated with other jewellers, filigree artists and goldsmiths) and aided by Dragan Vojvodić, historian and professor of medieval artwork and the corresponding member of the Serbian Academy of Sciences and Arts. The crowns were made of silver, which were gilded with nickel and gold. All the pearls are genuine from freshwater sources, while the precious stones were grown from dust under artificial conditions. About 13 techniques were used during the construction and everything was done the old-fashioned way. Each crown is worked between four and six months. They were officially revealed to the public in December 2022. The crowns were temporarily displayed in the Historical Museum of Serbia between February and March 2023. They are planned to be permanently displayed at the newly planned museum location, previously the Belgrade Main railway station.

The first crown recreated was of King Stefan Uroš II Milutin Nemanjić, recreated from the fresco depictions in the King's Church of Studenica Monastery. Weighing in at 1.6 kilograms, the crown is adorned with 26 rubies, 18 sapphires, 23 amethysts, 4 lapis lazulis and 407 pearls. The production of the crown took four months, and the author used 13 techniques: rolling, cutting, forging, twisting, granulation, hand engraving, filigree, riveting, soldering, polishing, gilding, stone processing and faceting. Special care was given to make the crown of Stefan Dušan more elaborate and richer compared to Stefan Milutin′s, more fit for his Emperor status. Serbian rulers had several crowns during their reign, with Stefan Milutin′s crown as depicted in the frescoes in Gračanica Monastery being the most elaborate from all the depictions of the ruler.

Second crown recreated was of Emperor Stefan Uroš IV Dušan Nemanjić, recreated from the fresco depictions in Lesnovo Monastery. Weighing in at 1.7 kilograms, the production of the crown took six months, also using the same 13 techniques.

The third crown recreated was of Prince Stefan Lazarević, recreated from the fresco depictions in Manasija Monastery. Weighing in at 1.4 kilograms (1434.37 grams), the crown is adorned with 3 obsidians, 13 tourmalines, 3 aquamarines, 3 garnets, 4 amethysts, 26 rubies, 29 sapphires and 69 pearls. While the original crown was most likely made of gold or glam silver, the replica was made of gilded silver.

The crown of Empress Helena of Bulgaria, Emperor Stefan Dušan′s wife, was done by Jasminka Brkanović and was also recreated from the fresco depictions in Lesnovo Monastery. Due to the needs of the permanent display of the historical museum, the crown of Saint Helen of Serbia, wife of King Stefan Uroš I Nemanjić and mother of King Uroš II Milutin Nemanjić, was recreated from the fresco depictions in Sopoćani Monastery by Simon and Marsel Čivljak.

Simon and Marsel Čivljak recreated the crown of Queen Simonida Nemanjić, wife of King Stefan Uroš II Milutin Nemanjić, from the fresco depictions in the King's Church of Studenica Monastery, as well as the crown of King Mihailo I Vojislavljević, from the fresco depictions in the Church of St. Michael in Ston. The reconstruction of the crown of Despot Đurađ Branković was made by filigree artist Goran Ristović Pokimica, in consultation with relevant experts and based on the charter preserved in the Esphigmenou Monastery on Mount Athos. He also reconstructed the sebastokrator’s wreath of King Stefan Nemanjić, based on the fresco in the Studenica Monastery. The reconstruction of the possible appearance of the crown of King Tvrtko I Kotromanić was made by filigree artist Goran Ristović Pokimica, in consultation with archaeologist Marko Aleksić.

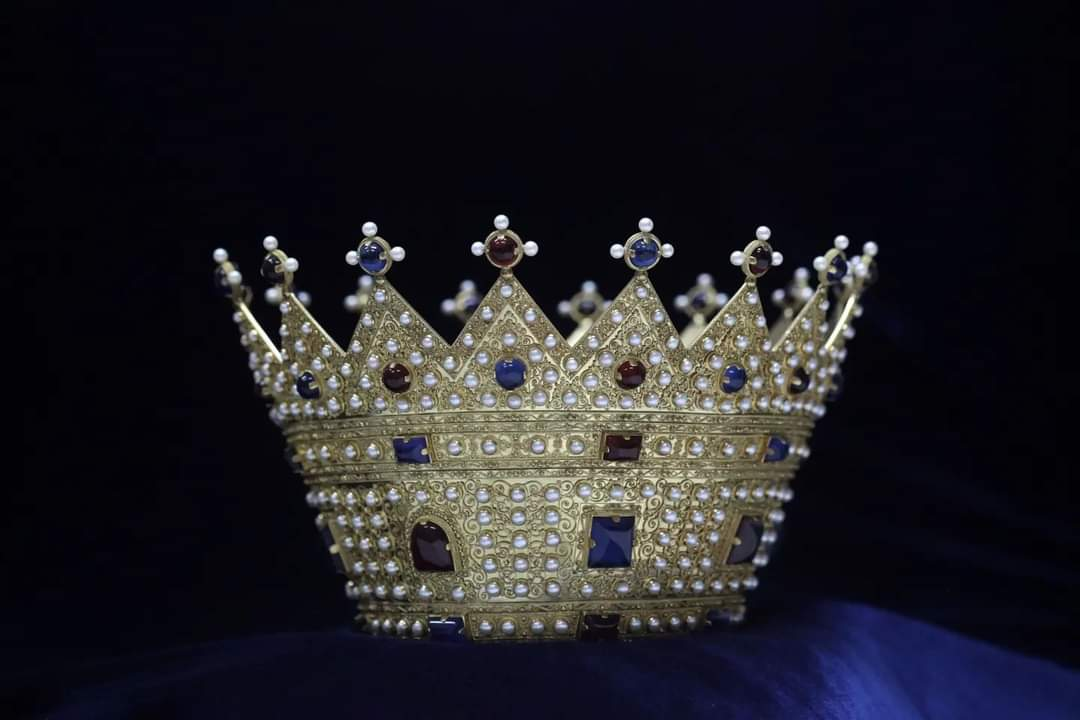
Crown of Queen Simonida

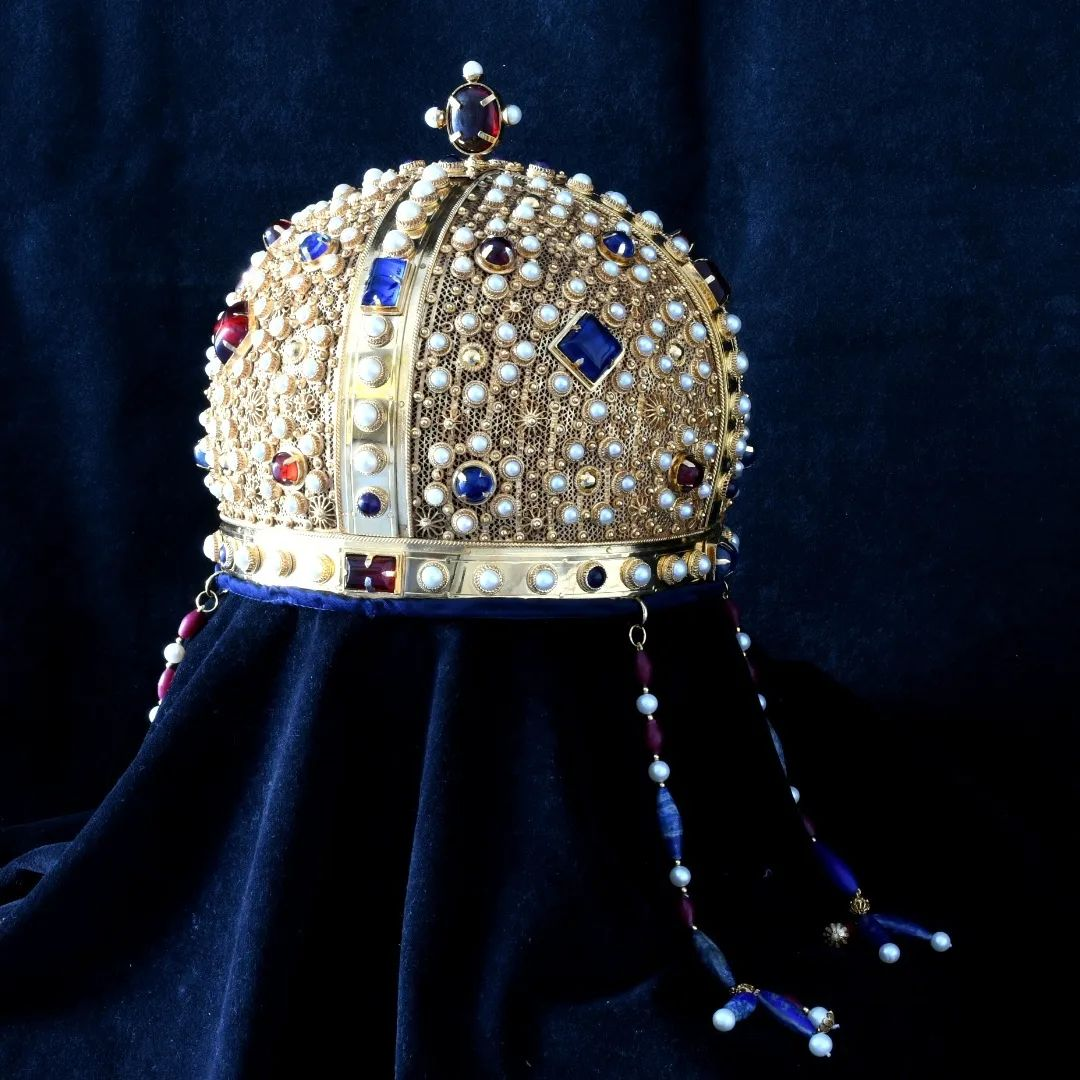
Crown of Emperor Stefan Dušan

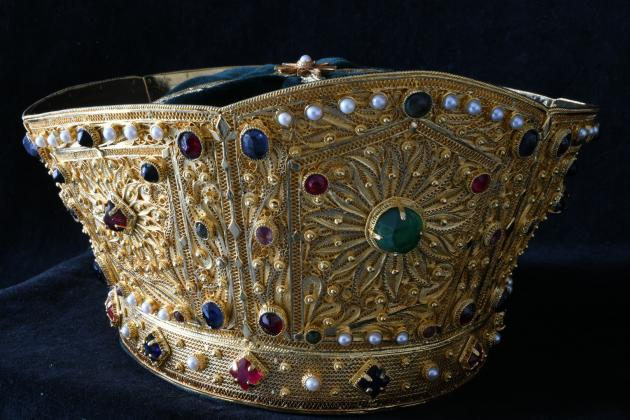
Crown of Despot Stefan Lazarević

== See also ==
- History of Serbia
- List of Serbian monarchs
- Kingdom of Serbia
- Serbian Empire
- Coronation of the Serbian monarch
- Serbian royal titles
