= Alexander, Crown Prince of Yugoslavia =

Former crown prince of Yugoslavia (born 1945)

Alexander Karađorđević Александар Карађорђевић
- Crown Prince of Yugoslavia
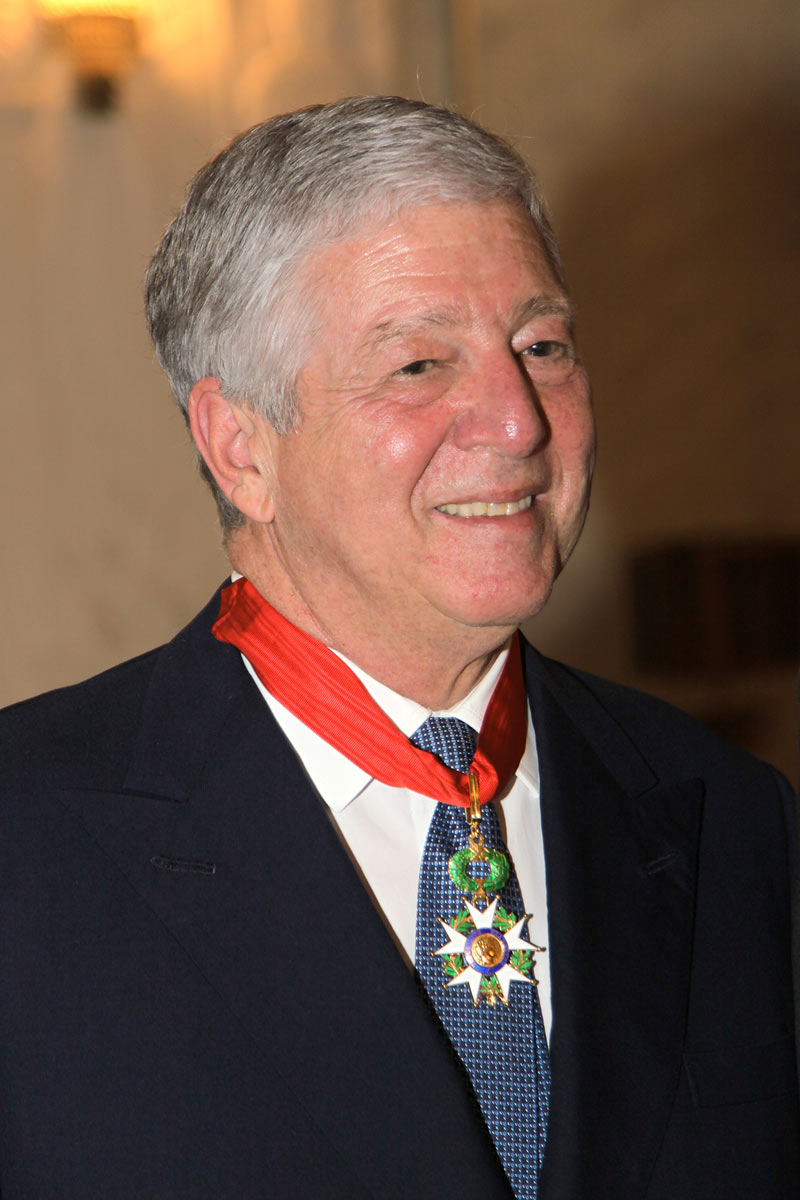
- Alexander receiving the rank of Commander of the Légion d’Honneur, 2015

Head of the Royal House Karađorđević
- Tenure: 3 November 1970 – present
- Predecessor: Peter II
- Heir apparent: Philip

Crown Prince of Yugoslavia
- Tenure: 17 July 1945 – 29 November 1945
- Predecessor: Peter II
- Successor: Monarchy abolished
- Born: 17 July 1945 (age 81); Claridge's, Mayfair, London, England (Note: See paragraph one of § Birth and childhood)
- Spouse: Princess Maria da Glória of Orléans-Braganza (m. 1972; div. 1985) Katherine Clairy Batis (m. 1985)
- Issue: Prince Peter; Philip, Hereditary Prince; Prince Alexander
- House: Karađorđević
- Father: Peter II of Yugoslavia
- Mother: Alexandra of Greece and Denmark
- Military career
- Allegiance: United Kingdom
- Branch: British Army
- Service years: 1966–1972
- Rank: Captain
- Unit: 16th/5th The Queen's Royal Lancers

Alexander, Crown Prince of Yugoslavia (Serbian: Александар Карађорђевић, Престолонаследник Југославије, romanized: Aleksandar Karađorđević, Prestolonaslednik Jugoslavije; born 17 July 1945), is the head of the House of Karađorđević, the former royal house of the defunct Kingdom of Yugoslavia and its predecessor the Kingdom of Serbia. Alexander is the only child of King Peter II and Princess Alexandra of Greece and Denmark. He held the position of crown prince in the Democratic Federal Yugoslavia for the first four and a half months of his life, until the declaration of the Federal People's Republic of Yugoslavia later in November 1945, when the monarchy was abolished. In public he claims the crowned royal title of "Alexander II Karadjordjevic" (Serbian: Александар II Карађорђевић, Aleksandar II Karađorđević) as a pretender to the throne.

Born and raised in the United Kingdom, he enjoys close relationships with his relatives in the British royal family. His godparents were King George VI of the United Kingdom and his daughter, the then-Princess Elizabeth (later Queen Elizabeth II). Through his father, Alexander is a descendant of Queen Victoria, through his great-great-grandfather Prince Alfred, Duke of Saxe-Coburg and Gotha, Victoria's second eldest son. Maternally, he is also a descendant of Queen Victoria, through his great-great-grandmother Victoria, German Empress, Victoria's eldest daughter. Alexander is known for his support of constitutional monarchism and his humanitarian work.

== Status at birth ==
As with many other European monarchs during World War II, King Peter II left his country to establish a government-in-exile. He left Yugoslavia in April 1941 and arrived in London in June 1941. The Royal Yugoslav Armed Forces capitulated in 18 April.

After the Tehran Conference, the Allies shifted support from royalist Chetniks to communist-led Partisans. Commenting on the event and what happened to his father, Crown Prince Alexander said, "He [Peter II] was too straight. He could not believe that his allies – the mighty American democracy and his relatives and friends in London – could do him in. But that's precisely what happened". In June 1944, Ivan Šubašić, the Royalist prime minister, and Josip Broz Tito, the Communist Partisan leader, signed an agreement that was an attempt to merge the royal government and communist movement.

On 29 November 1943, AVNOJ (formed by the Partisans) declared themselves the sovereign communist government of Yugoslavia and announced that they would take away all legal rights from the Royal government. On 10 August 1945, less than a month after Alexander's birth, AVNOJ named the country Democratic Federal Yugoslavia. On 29 November 1945, the country was declared a communist republic and changed its name to People's Federal Republic of Yugoslavia.

In 1947, all members of Alexander's family except for his granduncle Prince George were deprived of their Yugoslav citizenship and their property was confiscated.

As of 8 July 2015, the High Court in Belgrade found that decree 392, issued by the Presidency of the Presidium of the National Assembly on 3 August 1947, which deprived King Peter II and other members of the House of Karađorđević of their citizenship, was null and void from the moment of its adoption, in the parts pertaining to Crown Prince Alexander, and that all of its legal consequences are thus null and void.

== Birth and childhood ==
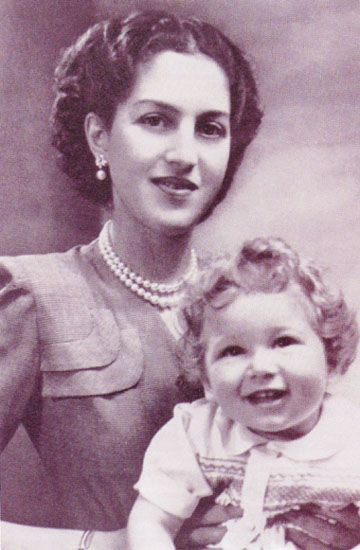
Queen Alexandra with her son, Crown Prince Alexander, c. 1946.

Alexander was born in Suite 212 of Claridge's Hotel in Brook Street, Mayfair, London, on 17 July 1945. The British Government is said to have temporarily ceded sovereignty over the suite in which the birth occurred to Yugoslavia so that the crown prince would be born on Yugoslav territory, though the story may be apocryphal, as there exists no documentary record of this. Another part of the story says that a box of soil from the homeland was placed under the bed, so the Prince could be born on Yugoslav soil. It is now Suite 214 and known as the 'Alexander Suite'.

He was the only child of King Peter II and Queen Alexandra of Yugoslavia. He was christened on 24 October at Westminster Abbey. His godparents were members of the British royal family, King George VI and Princess Elizabeth, who later became Queen Elizabeth II.

His parents were relatively unable to take care of him due to their various health and financial problems, so Alexander was raised by his maternal grandmother, Princess Aspasia of Greece and Denmark. He was educated at Trinity School, Institut Le Rosey, Culver Military Academy, Gordonstoun, Millfield and Mons Officer Cadet School, Aldershot, and pursued a career in the British military.

== Military service ==
Alexander graduated from the Royal Military Academy Sandhurst in 1966 and was commissioned as an officer into the British Army's [4th Royal Tank Regiment) subsequently transferring to the 16th/5th The Queen's Royal Lancers regiment, rising to the rank of captain. His tours of duty included West Germany, Italy, the Middle East, and Northern Ireland. After leaving the army in 1972, Alexander, who speaks several languages, pursued a career in international business.

== Personal life ==
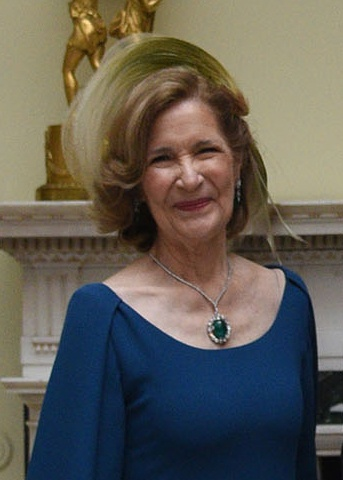
Alexander's first wife: Princess Maria da Glória of Orléans-Braganza, Duchess of Segorbe (b. 1946) at White Palace (2017)

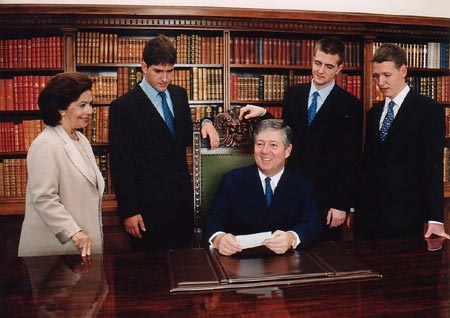
Alexander with his three sons and second wife Katherine in 2004.

On 1 July 1972 at Villamanrique de la Condesa, near Seville, Spain, he married Princess Maria da Gloria of Orléans-Braganza (b. 1946) from the Brazilian imperial family, at the parish church of St. Mary Magdalene. They are double 4th cousins once removed as both are descendants of Prince Ferdinand of Saxe-Coburg and Gotha (1785–1851) and Princess Maria Antonia von Koháry (1797–1862), as well as of Pedro I, Emperor of Brazil and Archduchess Maria Leopoldina of Austria. They have three sons: Peter (born 5 February 1980), and fraternal twins: Philip and Alexander (both born 15 January 1982).

Alexander and Maria da Gloria divorced on 19 February 1985. Both of them married for the second time. Maria da Gloria married Ignacio de Medina, Duke of Segorbe (b. 1947), while Crown Prince Alexander married Katherine Clairy Batis, daughter of Robert Batis and Anna Dosti, civilly on 20 September 1985, and religiously the following day, at St. Sava Serbian Orthodox Church, Notting Hill, London. Since their marriage, she is known as Crown Princess Katherine, as per the royal family's website.

On 16 December 2017, Alexander attended with his wife the state funeral of his first cousin once removed, King Michael of Romania in Bucharest, along with other heads of European royal families and invited guests.

On 19 September 2022, Crown Prince Alexander and his wife Katherine attended the state funeral of his godmother Queen Elizabeth II.

On 6 February 2024, following the news about King Charles' health, Alexander himself revealed that he had been treated for early stage prostate cancer in December 2023.

== Return to Yugoslavia ==
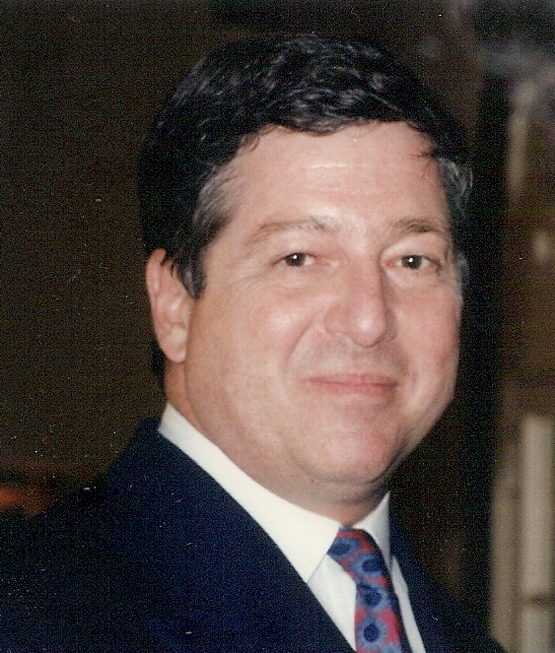
Crown Prince Alexander in Canada, 1992

Alexander first came to Yugoslavia in 1991. He actively worked with the opposition to Slobodan Milošević and moved to Yugoslavia after Milošević had been deposed in 2000.

On 27 February 2001, the parliament of the Federal Republic of Yugoslavia (FRY) passed legislation conferring citizenship on members of the Karađorđević family. The legislation may also have effectively annulled a decree stripping the family of its citizenship of the Socialist Federal Republic of Yugoslavia (SFRY) in 1947.

The annulment was the topic of some debate. Notably, the FRY was not the successor of the SFRY; rather the FRY was a new state (and was admitted to the United Nations as a new state on that basis). Therefore, the jurisdiction of a new state to annul an action of a different former state was questioned. In effect, the Karađorđević family had FRY citizenship conferred upon them, not "restored" as such.

The FRY legislation also addresses restoration of property to the Karađorđević family. In March 2001, the property seized from his family, including royal palaces, was returned for residential purposes with property ownership to be decided by parliament at some later date.

He has lived since 17 July 2001 in the Royal Palace (Kraljevski Dvor) in Dedinje, an exclusive area of Belgrade. The Palace, which was completed in 1929, is one of two royal residences in the Royal Compound; the other is the White Palace, which was completed in 1936.

=== Belief in constitutional monarchy ===
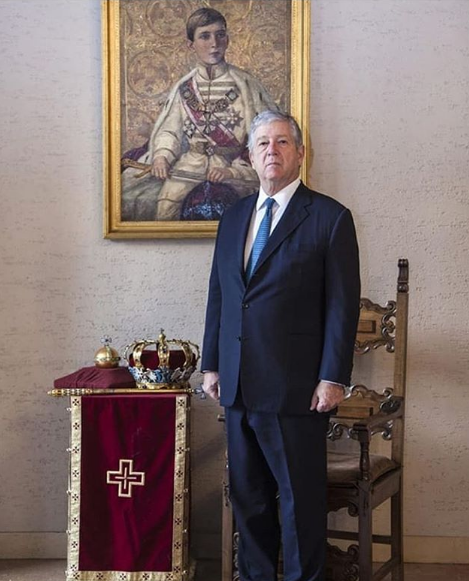
Crown Prince Alexander with the royal regalia (2018)

Alexander is a proponent of re-creating a constitutional monarchy in Serbia and sees himself as the rightful king. He believes that monarchy could give Serbia "stability, continuity and unity".

A number of political parties and organizations support a constitutional parliamentary monarchy in Serbia. The Serbian Orthodox Church has openly supported the restoration of the monarchy. The assassinated former Serbian Prime Minister Zoran Đinđić was often seen in the company of the prince and his family, supporting their campaigns and projects, although his Democratic Party never publicly embraced monarchism.

Crown Prince Alexander has vowed to stay out of politics. He and Princess Katherine spend considerable time engaging in humanitarian work.

The Crown Prince has, however, increasingly participated in public functions alongside the leaders of Serbia, the former Yugoslav republics and members of the diplomatic corps. On 11 May 2006, he hosted a reception at the Royal Palace for delegates attending a summit on Serbia and Montenegro. The reception was attended by the Governor of the National Bank of Serbia, as well as ambassadors and diplomats from Slovenia, Poland, Brazil, Japan, the United States, and Austria. He later delivered a keynote speech in front of prime ministers Vojislav Koštunica and Milo Đukanović. In the speech he spoke of prospective Serbian membership of the European Union. He told delegates:

In addition, we in Serbia and Montenegro must take into account that whatever form we take within the European Union, we have only but one choice and that is to work for the common good of all member nations. It is also central to take into account that stability in our region will be enhanced when Serbia is fully at peace with itself.

Following Montenegro's successful independence referendum on 21 May 2006, the re-creation of the Serbian monarchy found its way into daily political debate. A monarchist proposal for the new Serbian constitution has been published alongside other proposals. The document approved in October is a republican one. The Serbian people have not had a chance to vote on the system of government.

The Crown Prince raised the issue of a royal restoration in the immediate aftermath of the vote. In a press release issued on 24 May, he stated:

It has been officially confirmed that the people of Montenegro voted for independence. I am sad, but I wish our Montenegrin brothers peace, democracy and happiness. The people of Montenegro are our brothers and sisters no matter what if we live in one or in two countries, that is how it was and that is how it will be forever.

I strongly believe in a Constitutional Parliamentary Kingdom of Serbia. Again, we need to be proud, a strong Serbia that is at peace with itself and with its neighbors. We were a proud, respected and happy country in the days of my great grandfather King Peter I. So, we can do it! Only if we have a form of governance close to the Serbian soul: the Kingdom of Serbia.

Simply, the King is above daily politics, he is the guardian of national unity, political stability and continuity of the state. In Constitutional Parliamentary Monarchies the King is the protector of public interest: there is no personal or party interest. What is most important is the interest of Serbia.

I am ready to meet all our politicians; we have to work together for the common good of Serbia, and to be friends in the name of the future of our country. I appeal for the end of the continuous political wrangling, division and arguments. I appeal for mature democratic debate in the interest of Serbia. Serbia must have clear and realistic objectives.

In 2011, an online open access poll by Serbian middle-market tabloid newspaper Blic showed that 64% of Serbians support restoring the monarchy. Another poll in May 2013 had 39% of Serbians supporting the monarchy, with 32% against it. The public also had reservations with Alexander's apparent lack of knowledge of the Serbian language. On 27 July 2015, newspaper Blic published a poll "Da li Srbija treba da bude monarhija?" ("Should Serbia be a monarchy?"); 49.8% respondents expressed support in a reconstitution of monarchy, 44.6% were opposed and 5.5% were indifferent.

In 2017, an NGO, the Kingdom of Serbia Association, announced that in 2016, they had collected over 123,000 signatures of support for a referendum on Alexander being named king, short of the 150,000 needed to force a constitutional amendment.

== Honours ==
=== Dynastic ===
Styles of Alexander, Crown Prince of Serbia
- Reference style: His Royal Highness
- Spoken style: Your Royal Highness

- (Kingdom of Yugoslavia) House of Karađorđević: Grand Master of the Royal Order of Saint Prince Lazarus
- (Kingdom of Yugoslavia) House of Karađorđević: Grand Master of the Royal Order of the Star of Karađorđe
- (Kingdom of Yugoslavia) House of Karađorđević: Grand Master of the Royal Order of the White Eagle
- (Kingdom of Yugoslavia) House of Karađorđević: Grand Master of the Royal Order of the Crown
- (Kingdom of Yugoslavia) House of Karađorđević: Grand Master of the Royal Order of Saint Sava

=== Foreign ===
- Order of the Most Holy Annunciation (Kingdom of Italy).
- Order of Saints Maurice and Lazarus (Kingdom of Italy).
- Order of the Crown of Italy (Kingdom of Italy).
- Order of Saint Januarius (Royal House of Bourbon-Two Sicilies)
- Sacred Military Constantinian Order of Saint George (Royal House of Bourbon-Two Sicilies)
- Imperial Order of Dom Pedro I (The Imperial House of Brazil)
- The Imperial Order of the Rose (The Imperial House of Brazil)
- Order of the Immaculate Conception of Vila Viçosa (Royal House of Braganza of Portugal)
- Bailiff’s Cross of the Order of Malta (Sovereign Military Order of Malta).
- National Order of the Legion of Honour in the rank of Commander (Republic of France).
- Jubilee medal on the occasion of the 50th birthday of HM King Carl XVI Gustaf, Kingdom of Sweden
- Jubilee medal on the occasion of the 70th birthday of HM King Carl XVI Gustaf, Kingdom of Sweden

=== Church Decorations ===
- Order of Saint Sava, 1st class (Serbian Orthodox Church)
- Order of Saint Bishop Nicholas of Serbia (Diocese of Sabac, Serbian Orthodox Church)
- Order of Saint Prince Lazar (Diocese of Raska and Prizren, Serbian Orthodox Church)
- Grand Cross of the Order of the Holy Sepulchre (Orthodox) (Patriarchate of Jerusalem)

=== Other Orders ===
- Cross of Supreme Leader Djordje Stratimirovic, October 2021
- Order of Nikola Tesla, October 2021

== See also ==
- Heads of former ruling families

== Books, letters and articles ==
- Fenyvesi, Charles (1981). Royalty in Exile. London: Robson Books Ltd. ISBN 0-86051-131-6.
- Louda, Jiri; Maclagan, Michael (1981). Lines of Succession. London: Orbis Publishing. ISBN 0-85613-276-4.
- Pavle, Serbian Patriarch (29 November 2003). Letter to HRH Crown Prince Alexander II. Belgrade.
- Luxmoore, Jonathon, Serbian Orthodox Leader Calls For Monarchy To Be Reintroduced, Ecumenical News Daily Service (Belgrade), 8 December 2003

== Notes ==
Alexander, Crown Prince of Yugoslavia House of Karađorđević Born: 17 July 1945
Yugoslavian royalty
Preceded by Tomislav	Crown Prince of Yugoslavia; 17 July 1945 – 29 November 1945	Monarchy abolished
Titles in pretence
Vacant Title abolished, merger into Kingdom of Yugoslavia in 1918 Title last held by Peter I	— TITULAR — King of Serbia; 4 February 2003 – present Reason for succession failure: Serbia is a republic since the dissolution of Yugoslavia in 2003, gaining independence in 2006	Incumbent; Heir: Prince Filip
Preceded by Peter II	— TITULAR — King of Yugoslavia; 3 November 1970 – present Reason for succession failure: Kingdom abolished in 1945	Incumbent; Heir: Prince Filip
