= Duke of Segorbe =

Dukedom of Spain

Dukedom of Segorbe
- Creation date: 1469
- Created by: John II
- Peerage: Peerage of Spain
- First holder: Enrique de Aragón y Pimentel, 1st Duke of Segorbe
- Present holder: Ignacio de Medina y Fernández de Córdoba, 19th Duke of Segorbe
- Heir apparent: Sol de Medina y Orléans-Braganza, Countess of Ampurias

Duke of Segorbe (Spanish: Duque de Segorbe) is an hereditary title in the peerage of Spain, accompanied by the dignity of Grandee and granted in 1469 by John II of Aragon to his nephew, Enrique de Aragón, son of Infante Henry, Duke of Villena by his second wife, Beatriz de Pimentel (1416-1490), from whom the Ducal line of the House of Medinaceli descends.

== Current Duke of Segorbe ==
Don Ignacio Medina y Fernández de Córdoba (b. 1947) succeeded in 1969 as 19th Duke of Segorbe before marrying Princess Maria da Glória of Orléans-Braganza (b. 1946), former wife of Alexander, Crown Prince of Yugoslavia, in 1985.

The Duke and Duchess of Segorbe have two daughters:

- Sol María de la Blanca Medina y Orléans-Braganza, 54th Countess of Ampurias (b. 1986), heiress apparent to her father's titles; married to Pedro Domínguez-Majón.
- Ana Luna Medina y Orléans-Braganza, 17th Countess of Ricla (b. 1988); married to Giovanni Rapazzini de Buzzaccarini.

== Succession ==
As with other Spanish noble titles, the dukedom of Segorbe descended according to cognatic primogeniture, meaning that females could inherit the title if they had no brothers (or if their brothers had no issue). That changed in 2006, since when the eldest child (regardless of gender) can automatically succeed to noble family titles.

== List of titleholders ==
	Title	Period
Created by Juan II de Aragón
I	Enrique de Aragón y Pimentel	1476–1522
II	Alfonso de Aragón y Portugal	1522–1562
III	Francisco de Aragón y Cardona	1562–1575
IV	Juana de Aragón y Cardona	1575–1608
V	Enrique de Aragón Folc de Cardona y Córdoba	1608–1640
VI	Luis de Aragón y Fernández de Córdoba	1640–1670
VII	Joaquín de Aragón y Benavides	1670
VIII	Catalina de Aragón y Sandoval	1670–1697
IX	Luis Francisco de la Cerda y Aragón	1697–1711
X	Nicolás María Fernández de Córdoba y de la Cerda	1711–1739
XI	Luis Fernández de Córdoba y Spínola	1739–1768
XII	Pedro de Alcántara Fernández de Córdoba	1768–1789
XIII	Luis María Fernández de Córdoba y Gonzaga	1789–1806
XIV	Luis Joaquín Fernández de Córdoba y Benavides	1806–1840
XV	Luis Tomás Fernández de Córdoba y Ponce de León	1840–1873
XVI	Luis María Fernández de Córdoba y Pérez de Barradas	1873–1879
XVII	Luis Fernández de Córdoba y Salabert	1880–1956
XVIII	Victoria Eugenia Fernández de Córdoba y Fernández de Henestrosa	1956–1969
XIX	Ignacio Medina y Fernández de Córdoba	1969–present

== See also ==
Medinaceli arms

- Cardinal Fernández de Córdoba
- Casa de Medinaceli
- Grandees of Spain
