= Cosmopolitan Ultimate Women of the Year Awards =

The Ultimate Women of the Year awards are hosted by Cosmopolitan UK magazine every year. These awards focus on celebrating women from a range of fields including: entertainment, sports, business and music. Cosmopolitan also give awards to celebrate successful men. The awards started in 2006 and are hosted every December in the UK.

== Winners ==
=== Real Life Categories ===
- Ultimate Survivor: Sophia Mason
- Ultimate Women's Woman: Safiya Saeed
- Ultimate Man: Chris Green
- Ultimate Family Girl: Charly Lester
- Ultimate Campaigner: Liliane Umubyeyc
- Ultimate Businesswoman: Clare Molyneux
- Ultimate Friends: Natasha Adley & Lisa Meleck
- Ultimate Heroine: Sue Parker

=== Celebrity Categories ===
- Ultimate Newcomer: Leona Lewis
- Ultimate Mistress of Music: Rihanna
- Ultimate Comeback Queen: Myleene Klass
- Ultimate Couple: Tess Daly & Vernon Kay
- Ultimate 'Love the Skin you're in' Goddess: Charlotte Church
- Ultimate Celeb Men of the Year: Justin Lee Collins & Alan Carr
- Ultimate Lady Of Film: Cameron Diaz
- Ultimate Top Woman On TV: Ashley Jensen
- Ultimate Woman Who Made Us Care: Angelina Jolie
- Ultimate Sports Superhero: Maria Sharapova
- Ultimate 'Be The Best You Can Be' Woman Of The Year: Katie Price

=== Real Life Categories ===
- Ultimate Survivor: Allison John
- Ultimate Eco Queen: Harriet Lamb
- Ultimate Heroine: Louise Strajnic
- Ultimate Woman's Woman: Sandra Horley
- Ultimate Friends: Emma Freeborn And Laura Holgate
- Ultimate Future Fashion Star: Hannah Marshall
- Ultimate Editor's Choice: Josie Russell
- Ultimate Save The Planet Pioneer: Emily Cummins
- Ultimate Man: Errol Douglas

=== Celebrity Categories ===
- Ultimate Confidence Queen: Alesha Dixon
- Ultimate Fun Fearless Females: Girls Aloud
- Ultimate Mistresses Of Music: Sugababes
- Ultimate Comeback Star: Britney Spears
- Ultimate Hottie: Gethin Jones
- Ultimate Couple: Brad Pitt And Angelina Jolie
- Ultimate Icon: Kim Cattrall
- Ultimate Celeb Man: Gok Wan
- Ultimate TV Presenter: Myleene Klass
- Ultimate Believe In Your Talent Star: Estelle
- Ultimate Sports Superhero: Rebecca Adlington
- Ultimate TV Actress: America Ferrera
- Ultimate Film Actress: Kate Hudson
- Ultimate Against All Odds Star: Heather Frederiksen

== 2009 ==
- Ultimate Celeb Who Made Us Care: Brooke Kinsella
- Ultimate Newcomer: Pixie Lott
- Ultimate Green Queen: Amanda Jones
- Ultimate Sports Star: Jessica Ennis
- Ultimate Funny Woman: Ruth Jones
- Ultimate Film Actress: Megan Fox
- Ultimate Hottie: Ricky Whittle
- Ultimate Fearless Females: Karen Darke
- Ultimate Young Fashion Entrepreneur: Kate Fearnley
- Ultimate Love Story: John Walker And Rebecca Shone-Walker
- Ultimate TV Presenter: Holly Willoughby
- Ultimate Love-Your-Body Champions: Caryn Franklin And Erin O'Connor
- Ultimate Music Star: Leona Lewis
- Ultimate International Angel: Sarah Spencer
- Ultimate Man Of The Year: Andrew Flintoff
- Ultimate Inspirational Woman: Justice Williams
- Ultimate TV Actress: Lacey Turner
- Ultimate Family Girls: Melissa And Laura Shields

== 2010 ==
- Ultimate International Music Star – Katy Perry
- Ultimate Fashionista – Nicola Roberts
- Ultimate Campaigner – Leyla Hussein
- Ultimate International Angel - Victoria Ferguson
- Ultimate Man Of The Year – Dizzee Rascal
- Ultimate UK TV Actress – Karen Gillan
- Ultimate Sports Star – Jessica Ennis
- Ultimate US TV Actress – Christina Hendricks
- Ultimate Hottie – Mark Salling
- Ultimate Celebrity Who Made Us Care – Fearne Cotton
- Ultimate Friends - Joanne Lock And Meghan Fleet
- Ultimate Catwalk Queen – Crystal Renn
- Ultimate UK Music Star – Alexandra Burke
- Ultimate Editor's Choice – Katie Piper
- Ultimate Film Actress - Gemma Arterton
- Ultimate Woman's Woman – Jasvinder Sanghera
- Ultimate Love Story – Kevin And Jane Whitehead
- Ultimate Fearless Female – Kate Nesbitt
- Ultimate Theatre Star – Sheridan Smith
- Ultimate TV Presenter – Christine Bleakley

== 2011 ==
- Ultimate Music Star: Jessie J
- Ultimate Campaigner: Kristin Hallenga
- Ultimate TV Personality: Kelly Rowland
- Ultimate Style Queen: Daisy Lowe
- Ultimate Man Of The Year: Chris Jackson
- Ultimate Survivor: Nicole Campbell
- Ultimate Writer: Caitlin Moran
- Ultimate US TV Actress: Blake Lively
- Ultimate Fashion And Beauty Entrepreneur: Daisy Knights
- Ultimate Family Girl: Gemma Dowler
- Ultimate Newcomer: Michelle Dockery
- Ultimate Icon: Debbie Harry
- Ultimate Celeb Men Of The Year: JLS
- Ultimate Love Story: Rachael And Nathan Cumberland
- Ultimate Theatre Star: Amanda Holden
- Ultimate Film Star: Mila Kunis
- Ultimate UK TV Actress: Lauren Socha
- Ultimate Editor's Choice: Lisa And Louise Hawker

== 2012 ==
- Ultimate Confidence Queens – The Kardashians
- Ultimate Men - One Direction
- Ultimate Campaigners – Ruth Rogers And Natasha Devon
- Ultimate Olympian – Jessica Ennis
- Ultimate UK TV Actress – Vicky McClure
- Ultimate Editor's Choice – Stephanie Kercher
- Ultimate Film Actress – Jennifer Lawrence
- Ultimate Paralympian – Sarah Storey
- Ultimate Family Girl – Melanie Burgess
- Ultimate Fun Fearless Female – Nicole Scherzinger
- Ultimate International TV Actress – Melissa George
- Ultimate Love Story – Emma And Chris Barton
- Ultimate TV Personality – Tulisa Contostavlos
- Ultimate Fundraiser – Polly Brooks
- Ultimate Hottie – Louis Smith
- Ultimate Pop Star - Cheryl Cole
- Ultimate Style Icon – Kelly Osbourne
- Ultimate Newcomer - Zawe Ashton
- Ultimate Street Style Icon – Susan Yasemin

== 2013 ==
=== Real Life Categories ===
- Ultimate Campaigner – Sophie Morgan
- Ultimate Love Story – Charlotte And Chris Clark
- Ultimate Editor's Choice – Baroness Doreen Lawrence
- Ultimate Women's Warrior – Sarbjit Athwal
- Ultimate Global Champions – Corrie Fraser And Olivia Barker
- Ultimate Survivor – Jessica Price
- Ultimate New Feminist – Laura Bates
- Ultimate Young Creative Talent – Abygail Bradley

=== Celebrity Categories ===
- Ultimate Music Star - Ellie Goulding
- Ultimate Film Actress – Scarlett Johansson
- Ultimate Style Icon – Paloma Faith
- Ultimate TV Personality – Nicole Scherzinger
- Ultimate Export – Little Mix
- Ultimate Radio Personality – Jameela Jamil
- Ultimate Accessories Queen – Lulu Guinness
- Ultimate Sportswoman – Christine Ohuruogu
- Ultimate Celeb Inspiration – Angelina Jolie
- Ultimate Men – Ant And Dec
- Ultimate UK Actress - Sheridan Smith

== 2014 ==
- Ultimate Style Icon – Abbey Clancy
- Ultimate TV Personality – Mel B
- Ultimate Writer – Lena Dunham
- Ultimate Trailblazer – Paris Lees
- Ultimate #Fabulousfriends – The Saturdays
- Ultimate Game Changer – Dr Neha Pathak
- Ultimate Campaigner – Temi Mwale
- Ultimate Icon – Vivienne Westwood
- Ultimate Love Story – Tom And Ellen Nabarro
- Ultimate Men Of The Year – McBusted
- Ultimate International Music Star – Taylor Swift
- Ultimate Woman Of Courage – Kirsty Howard
- Ultimate Breakthrough Actress – Natalie Dormer
- Ultimate Funny Woman – Morgana Robinson
- Ultimate Inspiration – Elliot Page (Note: Credited as Ellen Page)
- Ultimate UK Music Artist – Ella Henderson
- Ultimate Editor's Choice – Davina McCall
- Ultimate Body Confidence Queen – Bethany Townsend
- Ultimate International Man Of The Year – Samuel L Jackson
- Ultimate Sports Star – Jo Pavey

== 2015 ==
- Ultimate Woman Of The Year – Rebel Wilson
- Ultimate Solo Artist – Jess Glynne
- Ultimate Business Woman – Karren Brady
- Ultimate Girl Group – Little Mix
- Ultimate Sports Personality – Casey Stoney
- Ultimate Game Changer – Abi Morgan
- Ultimate Icon – Carrie Fisher
- Ultimate TV Personality, With Baileys – Caroline Flack
- Ultimate Trailblazer – Captain Hannah Winterbourne
- Ultimate Campaigner – Meltem Avcil
- Ultimate Empowerment Pioneer – Pavan Amara
- Ultimate Humanitarian – Sajda Mughal
- Ultimate Inspiration – Katie Cutler
