= Alexander I of Yugoslavia =

King of Yugoslavia from 1921 to 1934

Alexander I Aleksandar I Karađorđević Александар I Карађорђевић
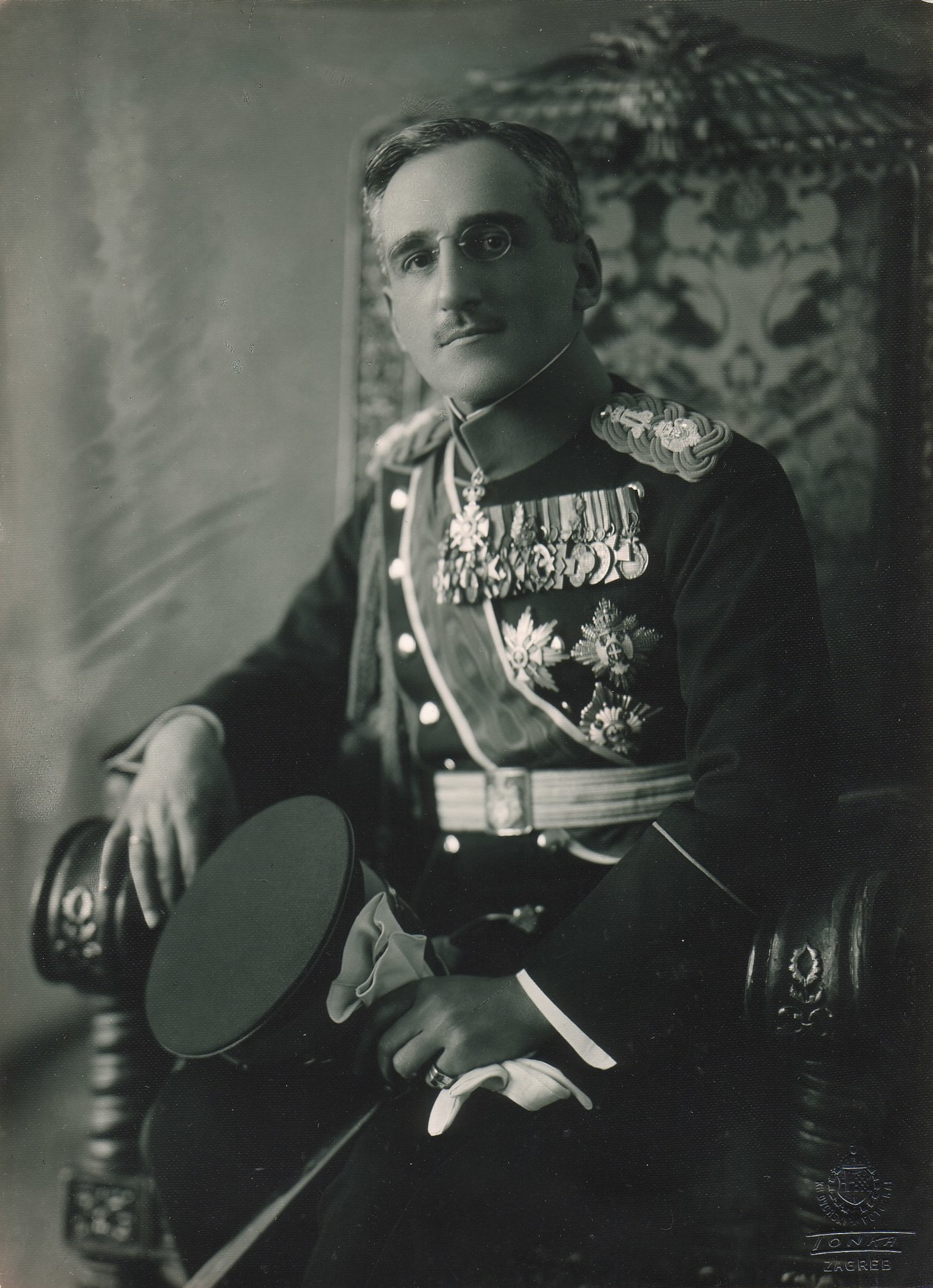
- Formal portrait, c. 1921–1934

King of Yugoslavia (Note: As King of the Serbs, Croats and Slovenes until 3 October 1929)
- Reign: 16 August 1921 – 9 October 1934
- Predecessor: Peter I
- Successor: Peter II

Prince Regent of Serbia and the Kingdom of Serbs, Croats and Slovenes
- Tenure: 24 June 1914 – 16 August 1921
- Monarch: Peter I of Serbia
- Born: 16 December 1888 [O.S. 4 December] Cetinje Royal Palace, Cetinje, Montenegro
- Died: 9 October 1934 (aged 45); Marseille, France
- Cause of death: Assassination
- Burial: Oplenac, Topola, Serbia
- Spouse: Maria of Romania (m. 1922)
- Issue: Peter II; Prince Tomislav; Prince Andrej
Names
- Alexander Karađorđević
- House: Karađorđević
- Father: Peter I of Serbia
- Mother: Ljubica of Montenegro
- Military career
- Allegiance: Kingdom of Serbia; Kingdom of Yugoslavia
- Service years: 1904–1921 (end of active service)
- Rank: Field Marshal
- Unit: Royal Yugoslav Army

Alexander I Karađorđević (Serbo-Croatian: Александар I Карађорђевић, Aleksandar I Karađorđević, (Note: Serbo-Croatian pronunciation: [aleksǎːndar př̩viː karadʑǒːrdʑevitɕ]; alternative pronunciations of Aleksandar and I are [alěksaːndar] and [pr̩̂ːviː], respectively.) 16 December [O.S. 4 December] 1888 – 9 October 1934) was King of the Serbs, Croats and Slovenes from 16 August 1921 to 3 October 1929 and King of Yugoslavia from 3 October 1929 until his assassination in 1934. His thirteen-year reign was the longest of the kingdom's three monarchs. He served as the de facto head of state of the Kingdom of Serbia from 1914 to 1918 and of Yugoslavia from 1918 to 1921 as prince regent for his father, Peter I.

Born in Cetinje, Montenegro, Alexander was the second son and fourth child of Peter and Zorka Karađorđević. The House of Karađorđević had been deposed in Serbia 30 years earlier by the rival House of Obrenović, and Alexander spent his early life in exile with his father in Montenegro and later Switzerland. He subsequently moved to the Russian Empire and enrolled in the imperial Page Corps. Following the May Coup and the assassination of King Alexander I Obrenović in 1903, Peter ascended the Serbian throne. In 1909, Alexander's elder brother, Prince George, renounced his succession rights, making Alexander heir apparent. Alexander distinguished himself as a field commander during the Balkan Wars, leading Serbian forces to victories over the Ottoman Empire and the Bulgarians. In 1914, he was appointed prince regent after his father transferred his royal duties due to ill health. During the First World War, he held nominal supreme command of the Royal Serbian Army.

In 1918, Alexander oversaw the unification of Serbia and the former Austro-Hungarian provinces of Croatia-Slavonia, Slovenia, Vojvodina, Bosnia and Herzegovina, and Dalmatia into the Kingdom of Serbs, Croats and Slovenes, in accordance with the Corfu Declaration. He subsequently became known as Alexander the Unifier. (Note: Serbo-Croatian: Aleksandar Ujedinitelj, Александар Ујединитељ, pronounced [aleksǎːndar ujedǐniteʎ]) Alexander continued as prince regent and de facto head of state until ascending the throne upon his father's death in 1921. An extended political crisis followed, culminating in the assassination of Croat political leader Stjepan Radić. In response, Alexander abolished the Vidovdan Constitution in 1929, prorogued parliament, renamed the state the Kingdom of Yugoslavia, and instituted a royal dictatorship. The 1931 Constitution formalised his personal rule and established Yugoslavia as a unitary state, increasing resentment among the non-Serb population. Domestic tensions were further exacerbated by the onset of the Great Depression, which severely affected the country's agrarian economy. In foreign policy, Alexander promoted the Balkan Pact with Greece, Romania, and Turkey, and sought closer relations with Bulgaria.

In October 1934, Alexander made an official visit to the French Republic to consolidate support for the Little Entente against Hungarian revanchism and Italian expansionism. While travelling through Marseille, he was assassinated by Vlado Chernozemski, an operative of the Internal Macedonian Revolutionary Organization acting with support from the Ustaše, led by Ante Pavelić. French Foreign Minister Louis Barthou was also killed in the attack. Alexander was succeeded by his eleven-year-old son, Peter II, under a regency council headed by his cousin Prince Paul.

== Early life ==
Alexander Karađorđević was born on 16 December 1888 [O.S. 4 December] in the Principality of Montenegro as the fourth child and second son of Peter Karađorđević and his wife, Princess Zorka of Montenegro. His paternal grandfather, also named Alexander, had been forced to abdicate as prince of Serbia and surrender power to the rival House of Obrenović. Alexander's maternal grandfather was Nicholas I, Prince of Montenegro. Despite enjoying support from the Russian Empire, at the time of Alexander's birth and early childhood, the House of Karađorđević was in political exile, with family members scattered all over Europe, unable to return to Serbia due to their rivalry with the House of Obrenović.

Serbia had recently been transformed from a principality into a kingdom under the Obrenovićes, who ruled with strong support from the Austro-Hungarian Empire. The antagonism between the two rival royal houses was such that, after the assassination of Prince Mihailo Obrenović in 1868 (an event in which the Karađorđevićes were suspected of taking part), the Obrenovićes made constitutional changes banning the Karađorđevićes from entering Serbia and stripping them of their civic rights.

Alexander was two when his mother, Princess Zorka, died in 1890 from complications while giving birth to his younger brother, Andrej, who died 23 days later. Alexander spent his childhood in Montenegro. In 1894, his widowed father took the four children, including Alexander, to Geneva, Switzerland, where he completed his elementary education. Alongside his older brother George, he continued his schooling at the imperial Page Corps in Petrograd, Russian Empire. The British historian Robert Seton-Watson described Alexander as becoming a Russophile during his time in Petrograd, feeling deep gratitude for the willingness of the Russian emperor Nicholas II to grant him refuge, where he was treated with great honour and respect.

As a page, Alexander was described as hard-working and determined while also being a "loner" who kept to himself and rarely showed his feelings. Nicholas II invited Alexander to dinners at the Winter Palace, where he was the guest of honour at meals hosted by the Russian imperial family, which was a great privilege for a prince from Serbia's deposed royal family. During his time in Petrograd, Alexander visited the Alexander Nevsky Monastery, where the abbot gave him an icon of Prince Alexander Nevsky and guided him to the grave of Marshal Alexander Suvorov. After his visit to the monastery, Alexander expressed the wish to be a great general like Marshal Suvorov or Prince Alexander Nevsky, saying he wanted to command either a great army or a great armada when he was a man.

In 1903, while young George and Alexander were in school, a group of conspirators carried out a bloody coup d'état in the Kingdom of Serbia, in which King Alexander and Queen Draga were murdered and dismembered. The House of Karađorđević thus retook the Serbian throne after 45 years, and Alexander's 58-year-old father became King of Serbia, prompting George and Alexander to return to Serbia to continue their studies. After Alexander's 15th birthday, King Peter had him enlisted in the Royal Serbian Army as a private, with instructions to his officers to promote his son only if he proved worthy. On 25 March 1909, Alexander was suddenly recalled to Belgrade by his father with no explanation offered other than that he had an important announcement for his son.

=== Becoming crown prince ===
In 1909, a scandal broke when Crown Prince George, Alexander's older brother, killed a servant by kicking him in the stomach. Following pressure from powerful figures such as Prime Minister Nikola Pašić and high-ranking officers Dragutin "Apis" Dimitrijević and Petar Živković, George publicly renounced his claim to the throne in March of that year in favour of Alexander.

In 1910, Alexander nearly died from stomach typhus and was left with stomach problems for the rest of his life. In the run-up to the First Balkan War, Alexander played the role of a diplomat, visiting Sofia to meet Tsar Ferdinand I of Bulgaria for secret talks on forming a Balkan League to drive the Ottoman Turks out of the Balkans. Both Bulgaria and Serbia had rival claims to the Ottoman region of Macedonia, so Alexander, along with Ferdinand's son Crown Prince Boris, travelled to Petrograd to meet with Emperor Nicholas II and request Russian mediation. In March 1912, Serbia and Bulgaria signed a defensive alliance, which Greece joined in May.

== Balkan Wars ==
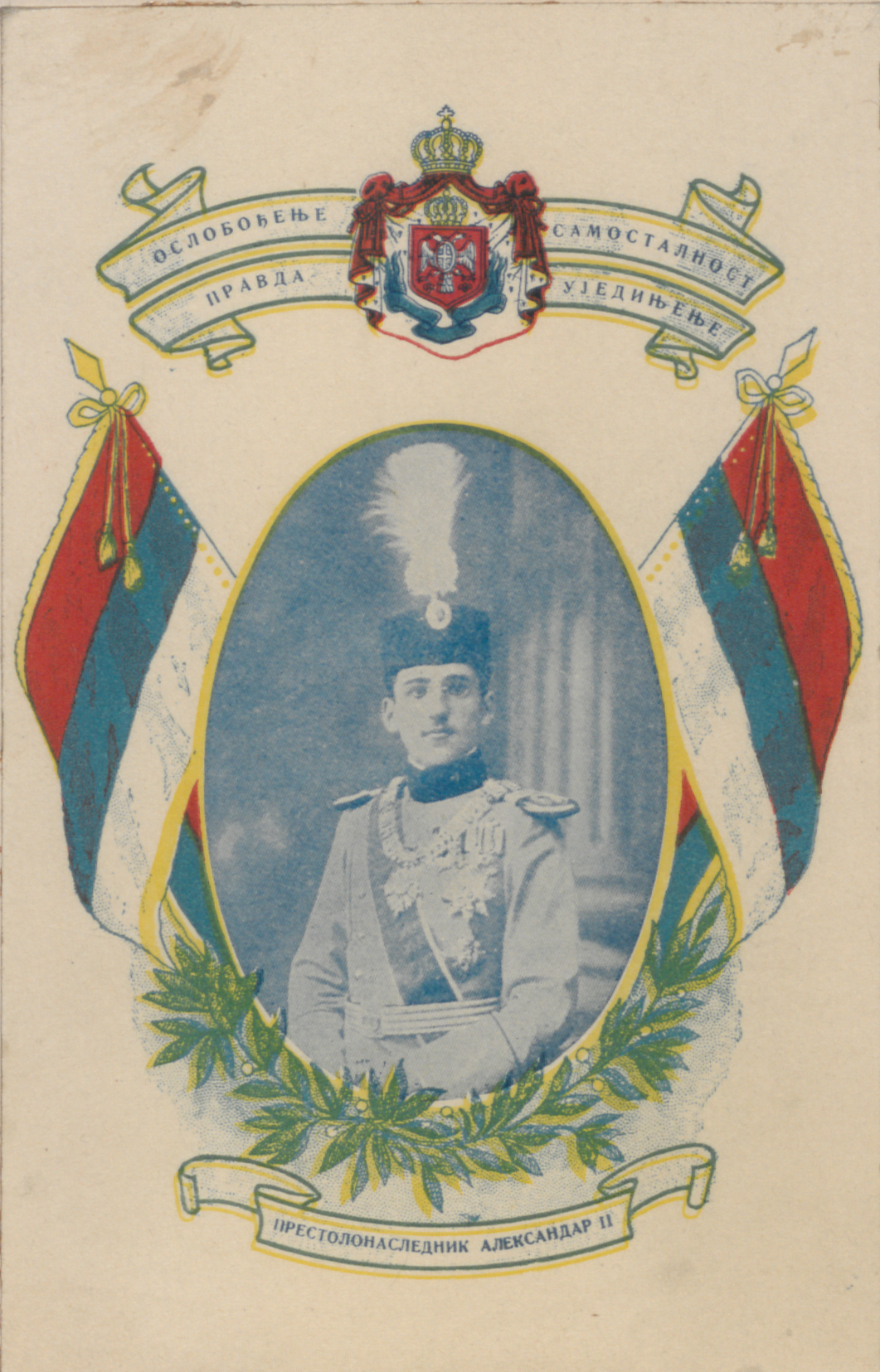
A wartime postcard of Alexander

In March 1912, Alexander met with ten senior military commanders. They agreed to end all internal conflicts in the Royal Serbian Army and fully commit to realising national goals, which allowed space for consolidation before the two successive Balkan Wars.

In the First Balkan War in 1912, as commander of the First Army, Crown Prince Alexander fought victorious battles at Kumanovo and Bitola. One of Alexander's most cherished moments came when he drove the Ottoman Turks out of Kosovo and, on 28 October 1912, led the Serbian army in a review on the Field of Blackbirds. The Field of Blackbirds was where the Serbs under Prince Lazar had been defeated in a legendary battle by the Ottoman sultan Murad I on 28 June 1389, and is regarded by the Serbs as holy ground. It was a great honour for him to pay his respects to the Serbs who had fallen in that earlier battle. In the aftermath of the First Balkan War, disputes emerged among the victors over control of Macedonia, and Serbia and Greece signed an alliance against the Kingdom of Bulgaria.

After the Ottoman defeat and withdrawal from Skopje, Prince Alexander was met with flowers by the local people. He stopped and asked a seven-year-old girl, Vaska Zoicheva, "What are you?" (Pa šta si ti?) When she replied "Bulgarian!" (Bugarka!), the prince slapped her. News of the event spread quickly around Bulgaria. In 1920 and 1921, Serbian authorities searched for the girl's father, Danail Zoichev, and offered him money to renounce the event as fictional, but he refused.

Later in 1913, during the Second Balkan War, Alexander commanded the Serbian army at the Battle of Bregalnica against the Bulgarians. In the aftermath of the war, the Treaty of Bucharest assigned the region of Vardar Macedonia to Serbia. Prince Alexander took sides in the complicated power struggle over how Macedonia should be administered. Alexander bested Colonel Dragutin "Apis" Dimitrijević in this dispute, after which his father, King Peter, agreed to hand over royal powers to him. Although Colonel Dimitrijević had been the mastermind of the 1903 coup that restored the House of Karađorđević to the Serbian throne, Alexander distrusted him, regarding his attempts to set himself up as a "kingmaker" and to turn the Serbian army into a "state within the state" existing outside civilian control as a major threat.

Additionally, Alexander saw Dimitrijević as an irresponsible intriguer who, having betrayed one king, might always betray another. In January 1914, the Serbian prime minister Nikola Pašić sent a letter to the Russian emperor Nicholas II in which King Peter expressed a desire for his son to marry one of the daughters of Nicholas II. In his reply, Nicholas II stated that his daughters would not be forced into arranged marriages, but noted that on his most recent trips to Petrograd, Alexander had kept giving loving looks to Grand Duchess Tatiana during dinners at the Winter Palace, leading him to guess that Alexander wanted to marry her. On 24 June 1914, Alexander became regent of Serbia.

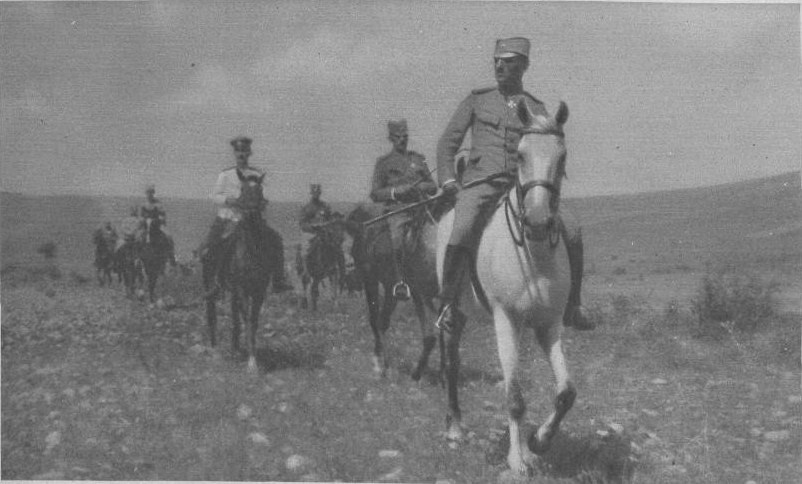
Prince Regent Alexander on the Macedonian Front in 1916

On 24 July 1914, Alexander was one of the first Serbian officials to see the Austrian ultimatum issued the previous day as containing terms deliberately written to inspire rejection. Turning to Russia for help, Alexander was advised to accept the ultimatum as much as he could. Alexander would later say he "went as far as an independent could" to accept the ultimatum, as Serbia accepted all of the terms except for the one demanding that Austrian police officers investigating the assassination of Archduke Franz Ferdinand be allowed to operate on Serbian soil with powers of arrest, which would have been the effective end of Serbia as an independent state. As expected, the Austrians declared war on Serbia, and Alexander threw himself into preparing his nation's defence. In a letter to his maternal grandfather, King Nicholas I of Montenegro, Alexander wrote: "God has willed yet again that the Serbian people should give their lives for Serbs everywhere ... I pray for the support of my dear and wise forefathers".

== World War I ==
At the outbreak of World War I, Alexander was the nominal supreme commander of the Serbian army; true command was in the hands of the Chief of Staff of Supreme Headquarters, a position held successively by Stepa Stepanović (during the mobilisation), Radomir Putnik (1914–1915), Petar Bojović (1916–1917) and Živojin Mišić (1918). The Serbian army distinguished itself in the battles at Cer and at the Drina (the Battle of Kolubara) in 1914, scoring victories against the invading Austro-Hungarian forces and evicting them from the country.

The British historian Max Hastings described the Serbian army in 1914 as the toughest in Europe and also the most egalitarian, with none of the distinctions of rank that characterised other European armies, exemplified by the fact that it was the only army in Europe in which officers shook hands with the other ranks. However, the Serbian army suffered major shortages of equipment, with a third of the men called up in August 1914 having no rifles or ammunition, and new recruits being advised to bring their own boots and clothing as there were no uniforms for them. Alexander ordered the Serbian police to conduct searches of houses all over Serbia to see if there were any rifles and ammunition to be seized for the army.

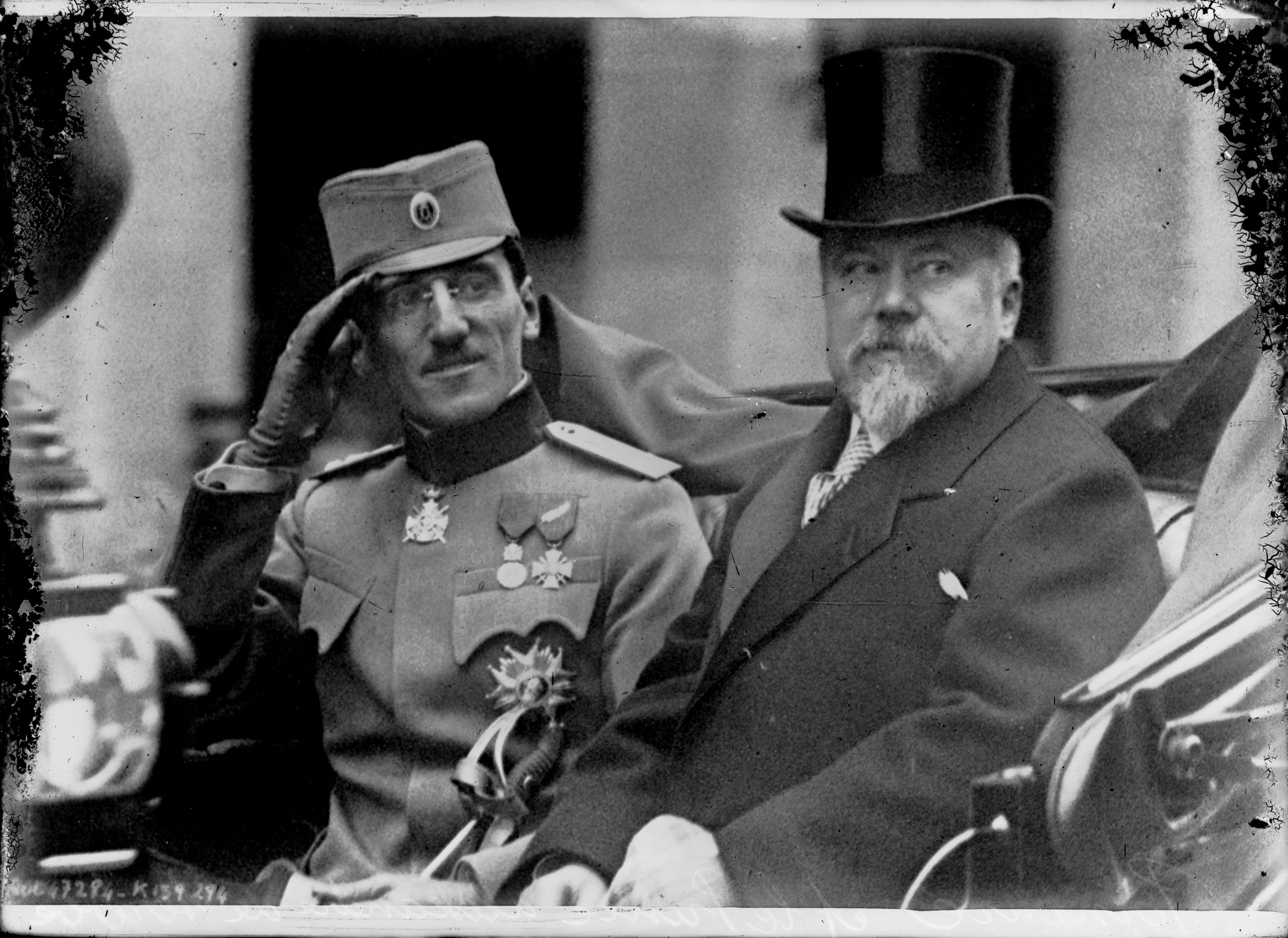
Regent Alexander and French president Raymond Poincaré in 1916

In 1915, the Serbian army was attacked on several fronts by the allied forces of Germany, Austria-Hungary and Bulgaria, suffering heavy losses. On 7 October 1915, an Austro-German army group under the command of German Field Marshal August von Mackensen invaded Serbia and, after encountering fierce resistance, took Belgrade on 9 October. On 14 October 1915, Bulgaria invaded Serbia, and on 16 October the Bulgarians took Niš, severing the railway that linked Serbia to Thessalonika in Greece. Attacked from the north by the Austrians and Germans and from the south by the Bulgarians, the Serbs were forced into the Kosovo region by 25 November 1915.

The massacres committed by the Austrians during their two invasions of Serbia in 1914 had caused enormous panic, and hundreds of thousands of Serbs fled their homes to escape the Austrians, which greatly delayed the movement of the Serbian army. Field Marshal Putnik persuaded Crown Prince Alexander and King Peter that it was better to keep the Serbian army intact to one day liberate Serbia rather than stand and fight in Kosovo as many Serb officers wanted.

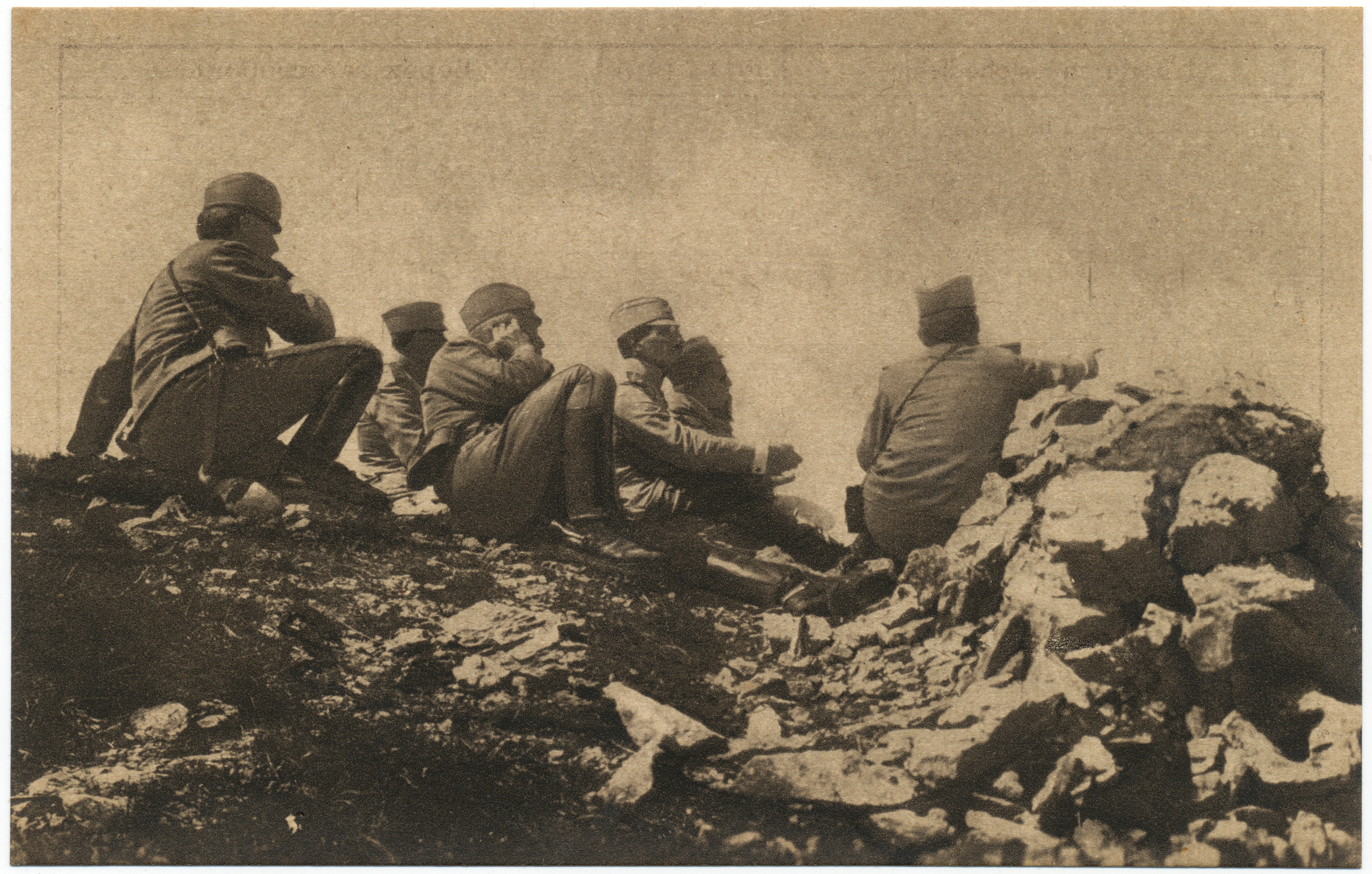
Regent Alexander with senior officers watching military positions during the battle of Kaymakchalan in 1916

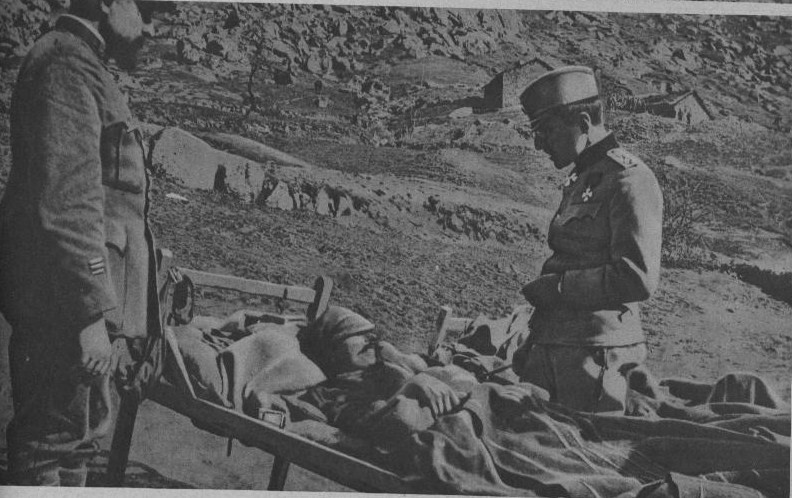
Regent Alexander with a military doctor visits a wounded Russian soldier on the Macedonian Front in 1917

The Serbian army withdrew through the gorges of Montenegro and northern Albania to the Greek island of Corfu, where it was reorganised. The march across the Accursed Mountains was harrowing, as the Serbian army, together with a mass of refugees, had to cross mountains rising to 3,000 feet in the middle of winter, with average daily temperatures of −20°, while battling hostile Albanian tribes and with the armies of Austria-Hungary, Germany, and Bulgaria in pursuit. Many Serbs died along the way. Alexander repeatedly exposed himself to danger during the march to the sea while his health declined. Upon reaching the coast, the surviving Serbs, who numbered about 140,000, were rescued by British and French ships, which took them to Corfu.

In September 1915, the Serbian army was estimated to have a strength of about 420,000 men; during the autumn campaign of 1915 and the subsequent retreat to the sea, 94,000 were killed or wounded and another 174,000 were captured or went missing. The losses suffered by Serb civilians during the autumn campaign and the retreat to the sea have never been calculated, but are estimated to be massive. The situation was further worsened by the outbreak of a typhus and relapsing fever epidemic that ravaged the country in 1915. Serb losses as a percentage of the population were the greatest of any belligerent in the war.

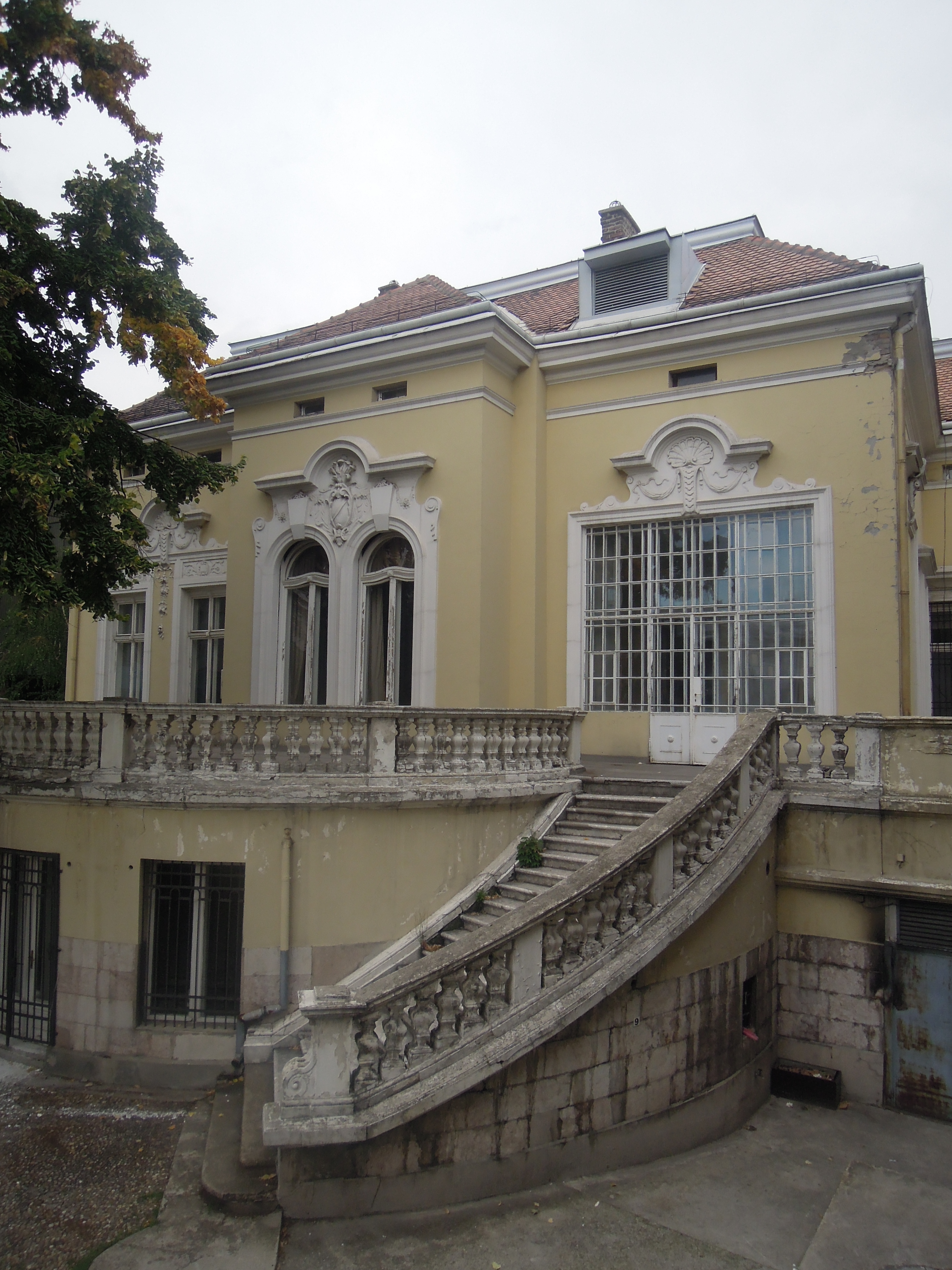
Krsmanović House, residence of Regent Alexander (1918–1922)

The surviving Serb soldiers were ultimately taken to Thessalonika to join the Armées alliées en Orient. In the autumn of 1916, Alexander's long-standing dispute with the Black Hand secret military society came to a head when Colonel Dimitrijević began to openly criticise his leadership. Suspecting a threat to the throne, Alexander promptly had officers who were members of the Black Hand arrested in December 1916 and tried for insubordination; after their convictions, Dimitrijević and several other Black Hand leaders were executed by firing squad on 23 June 1917.

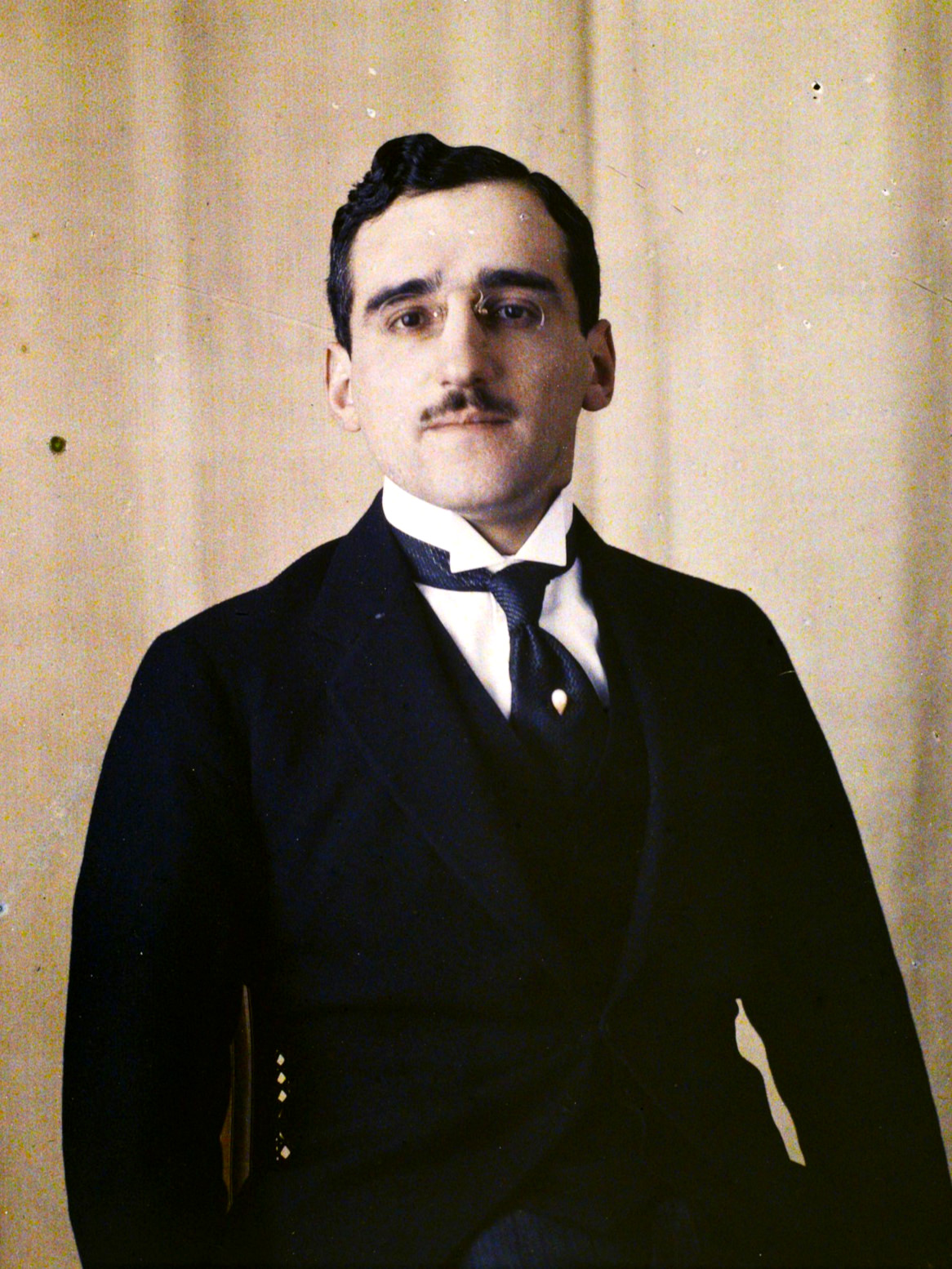
Alexander I, King of Yugoslavia. 1919 autochrome by Auguste Léon

At the same time, the Serbian government-in-exile led by Prime Minister Nikola Pašić was in contact with the Yugoslav Committee, a group of anti-Habsburg Croat, Slovene, and Bosnian Serb politicians and political activists led by Croatian politician Ante Trumbić, who aimed to create a new nation to be called Yugoslavia that would unite all of the South Slavic peoples into one unitary state. In June 1917, the Corfu Declaration was signed by Pašić and Trumbić, promising the creation of Yugoslavia after the war. Alexander seems to have been dubious about the plans for Yugoslavia, as throughout the war he spoke in terms of liberating Serbia. The introduction of the Fourteen Points by U.S. president Woodrow Wilson in January 1918 increased Alexander's doubts about Yugoslavia, as the tenth point spoke of "substantial autonomy" in the Austrian Empire after the war, rather than breaking it up. Unwilling to antagonise Wilson, Alexander favoured a "Greater Serbia" that would see the Serbs annex the South Slav-inhabited parts of the Habsburg lands. Though the Crown Prince declared in a speech during a visit to Britain that he was "fighting for Yugoslav unity in a Yugoslav state", when he addressed his own soldiers he stated he was fighting for "the reestablishment of Serbia, our dear homeland".

In a sign of the trouble to come, Trumbić demanded the right to speak for the South Slavs living under Austrian rule, a demand that Alexander rejected on the grounds that the Serbian government represented the South Slavs. After the army was regrouped and reinforced, it achieved a decisive victory on the Macedonian Front at Kajmakchalan. The Serbian army played a major part in the final Allied breakthrough on the Macedonian Front in the autumn of 1918. The debate over whether the Serbian army was fighting for Yugoslavia or Serbia resolved itself in October–November 1918 as the Austro-Hungarian Empire collapsed, leaving the Royal Serbian Army to move into the vacuum.

The Kingdom of Italy had ambitions to annex Dalmatia, Istria, and much of Slovenia, leading the Croats and the Slovenes to prefer living with their fellow Slavs. On 1 December 1918, the National Council asked Alexander to declare Serbia united with the former Austrian provinces of Croatia-Slavonia, Slovenia, Vojvodina, Bosnia and Herzegovina, and Dalmatia on the basis of the Corfu Declaration. Serbia had been devastated by the war, and one out of every five Serbs alive in 1914 was dead by 1918. Much of Alexander's time in the immediate post-war years was taken up with reconstruction.

== Regency ==
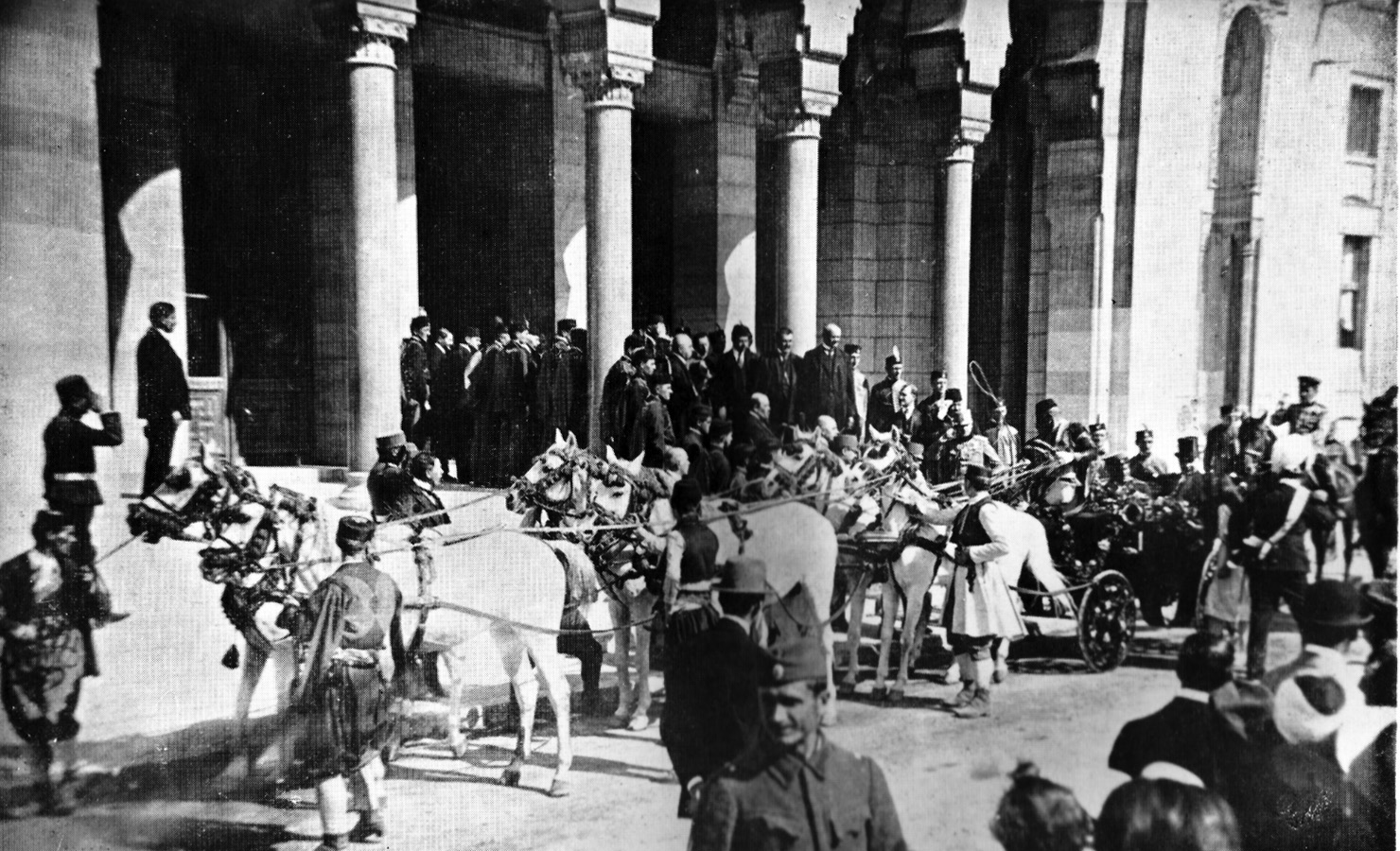
Alexander visiting Sarajevo for the first time in 1920

On 1 December 1918, in a prearranged ceremony, Alexander, as Prince Regent, received a delegation of the People's Council of Slovenes, Croats and Serbs; an address was read out by a member of the delegation, and Alexander made an address in acceptance. This was considered to be the birth of the Kingdom of Serbs, Croats and Slovenes. One of Alexander's first acts as Prince Regent of the new kingdom was to declare his support for the widespread demand for land reform, stating: "In our free state there can and will be only free landowners".

On 25 February 1919, Alexander signed a land reform decree breaking up all feudal estates over the size of 100 cadastral yokes, with compensation to be paid to the former landowners, except for those who belonged to the House of Habsburg and the other ruling families of enemy states in the Great War. Under the land reform decree, some two million hectares of land were handed over to half a million peasant households, though implementation was very slow, taking 15 years to complete.

In both Macedonia and Bosnia-Herzegovina, the majority of the landlords who lost land were Muslims, while the majority of their former tenants who received the land were Christians; in both places, land reform was seen as an attack on the political and economic power of the Muslim gentry. In Croatia, Slovenia, and Vojvodina, the majority of the landlords who lost their land were Austrian or Hungarian nobles who usually did not reside in those regions, meaning that, however much they might have resented the loss of their land, it did not have the same political repercussions as in Macedonia and Bosnia, where the Albanian and Bosnian Muslim landlords lived.

In June 1921, a war veteran and communist, Spasoje Stejić Baćo, attempted to assassinate Regent Alexander by throwing a bomb at his carriage. Thrown from a balcony, the bomb became entangled in telephone wires and exploded, wounding several bystanders.

== King of Yugoslavia ==
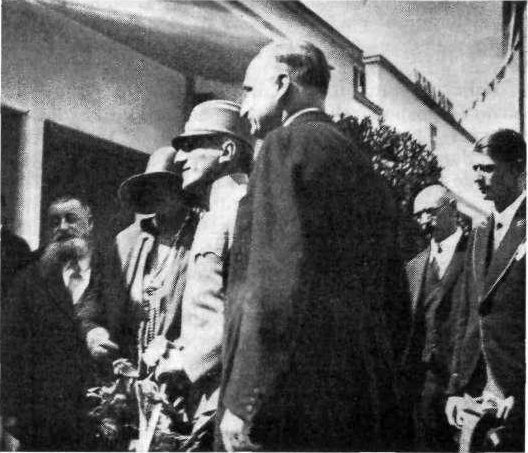
Alexander at the opening ceremony of the first Ljubljana Fair in Slovenia in 1920

On 16 August 1921, upon the death of his father, Alexander ascended to the throne of the Kingdom of Serbs, Croats and Slovenes, which from its inception was colloquially known both in the kingdom and throughout the rest of Europe as Yugoslavia. The historian Brigit Farley described Alexander as something of a cipher to historians, as he was a taciturn and reserved man who was loath to express his feelings either in person or in writing. He kept no diary and wrote no memoirs.

The British historian R. W. Seton-Watson, who knew Alexander well, called him a soldierly man most comfortable in a military milieu who was very quiet and surprisingly modest for a king. Seton-Watson described Alexander as having an "autocratic" personality, a man who was first and foremost a soldier who spent "six of his formative years" in the Serbian army, which left him with a "military outlook which unfitted him to deal with the delicate problems of constitutional government and which made compromise hard for him". Seton-Watson wrote that Alexander "...was very courageous, though not ever a man of strong physique or robust health. He had a strong fixity of purpose, great devotion to duty, powers of sustained work. He had great charm and simplicity of manner. He was accessible and very open to opinions—though he rarely acted on them, and though occasionally he reacted with positive violence, as in the case of the Slovene Zerjav who fainted in his presence."

Alexander was consistent in his belief in maintaining Yugoslavia as a unitary state and in his opposition to federalism, which he believed would lead to the break-up of Yugoslavia and perhaps his own assassination. In turn, Alexander's opposition to federalism related to his belief that in a federalised Yugoslavia, the Serbs living in Croatia and Bosnia-Herzegovina would be discriminated against by the Croats and Bosnian Muslims; he once told a Serbian Orthodox priest that federalism would be "stabbing the Serbs in the back".

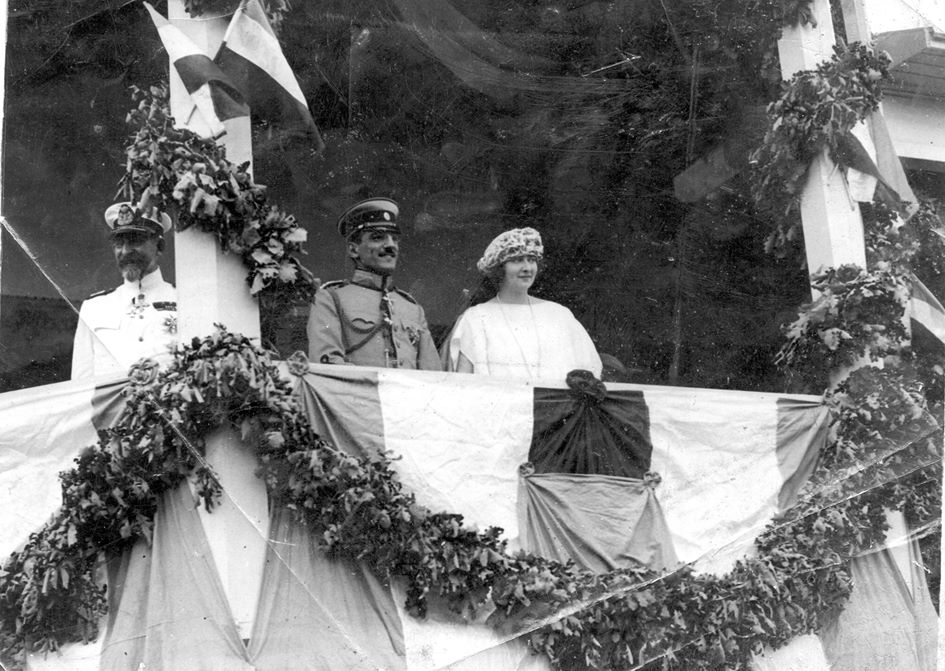
The wedding of King Alexander I and Princess Maria of Romania in 1922

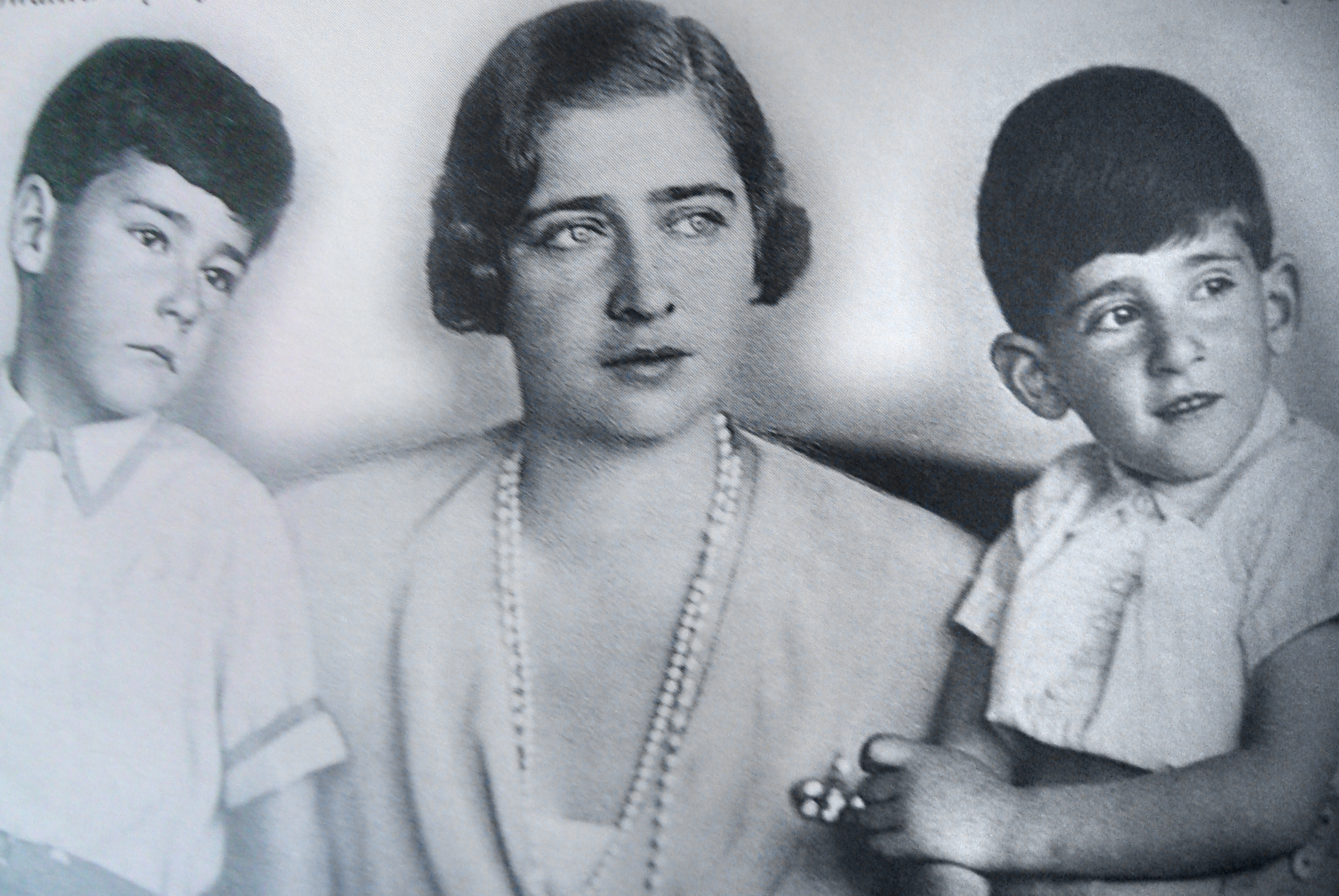
King Alexander I's wife, Queen Maria, with two of their children, Tomislav and Andrej

As a Karađorđević, Alexander was very conscious of the long blood feud between the Houses of Obrenović and Karađorđević that had disfigured Serb politics in the 19th century, and of the fact that the 1903 coup d'état that finally brought down the Obrenovićes had happened because the last Obrenović king, Alexander, was widely viewed as too subservient to Austria-Hungary and as having betrayed Serb interests. Because of the frequent shifts in loyalty within the Serbian army during the 19th century between the feuding royal families, Alexander was never entirely convinced that the Serb-dominated officer corps of the Royal Yugoslav Army was completely loyal to him, and he always feared that if he were seen as betraying Serb interests, as the last Obrenović king had been, he too might be overthrown and killed.

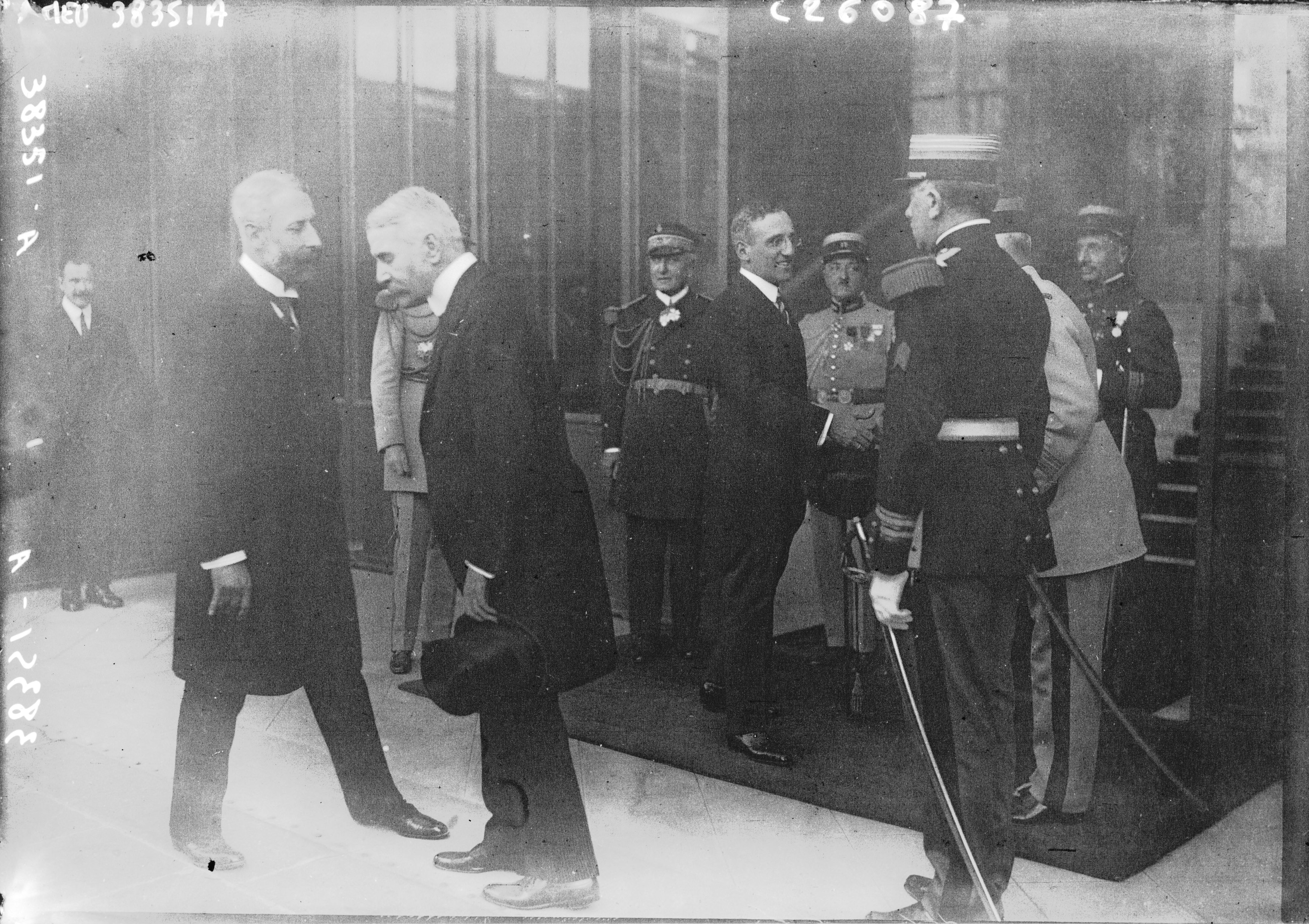
King Alexander I in 1926, Élysée Palace, Paris, France

On 8 June 1922, he married Princess Maria of Romania, who was a daughter of Ferdinand I of Romania and his wife, Princess Marie of Saxe-Coburg and Gotha, a granddaughter of Queen Victoria. They had three sons: Crown Prince Peter, and Princes Tomislav and Andrej. He was said to have wished to marry Grand Duchess Tatiana Nikolaevna of Russia, a cousin of his wife and the second daughter of Tsar Nicholas II, and was distraught by her untimely death in the Russian Civil War. The Russophile Alexander was horrified by the murders of the House of Romanov and during his reign was very hostile towards the Soviet Union, welcoming Russian émigrés to Belgrade.

=== Marriage and foreign relations ===
The lavish royal wedding to Princess Maria of Romania was intended to cement the alliance with Romania, a fellow "victor nation" in World War I that, like Yugoslavia, had territorial disputes with defeated nations such as Hungary and Bulgaria. For Alexander, the royal wedding was especially satisfactory as most of the royal families of Europe attended, which showed that the House of Karađorđević, a family of peasant origins who were disliked for slaughtering the rival House of Obrenović in 1903, were finally accepted by the rest of European royalty.

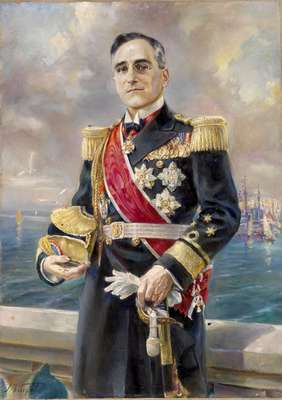
King Alexander I in the uniform of Admiral of the Navy on the Adriatic in 1930; oil on canvas by Ivan Vavpotič, National Museum of Slovenia

In foreign policy, Alexander favoured maintaining the international system created in 1918–1919, and in 1921 Yugoslavia joined the Little Entente with Czechoslovakia and Romania to guard against Hungary. Hungary refused to accept the Treaty of Trianon and made territorial claims against all three states of the Little Entente.

The principal enemy of Yugoslavia in the 1920s was Fascist Italy, which coveted much of modern-day Slovenia and Croatia. The origins of the Italo-Yugoslav dispute lay in the Italian contention that Italy had been "cheated" at the 1919 Paris Peace Conference out of what it had been promised in the secret Treaty of London in 1915. It was largely out of fear of Italy that Alexander signed a treaty of alliance in 1927 with France, which consequently became Yugoslavia's principal ally.

=== Crisis and dictatorship ===
Starting in 1926, an alliance of the Serb Democrats led by Svetozar Pribićević and the Croatian Peasant Party led by Stjepan Radić systematically obstructed the Yugoslav parliament to press for federalism in Yugoslavia, filibustering and filing nonsensical motions to prevent the government from passing any bills. In June 1928, the disputes between the opposition and the government deputies escalated when Puniša Račić from Montenegro took out his handgun and shot Radić on the floor of the parliament. The charismatic Radić, the "uncrowned king of Croatia", had inspired intense devotion in Croatia, and his assassination was seen as tantamount to a Serb declaration of war. The assassination pushed Yugoslavia to the brink of civil war and led Alexander to consider the "amputation" of Croatia as preferable to federalism. Alexander mused to Pribićević: "We cannot stay together with the Croats. Since we cannot, it would be better to separate. The best way would be to effect a peaceful separation like Sweden and Norway did". When Pribićević protested that this would be an act of "treason", Alexander told him he would think further about what to do. Alexander appointed as prime minister Father Anton Korošec, a Slovene Catholic priest, with a mandate to stop the slide towards civil war. On 1 December 1928, the lavish celebrations organised by the government for the tenth anniversary of the founding of the Kingdom of Serbs, Croats and Slovenes led to rioting in Zagreb that left ten people dead.

In response to the political crisis triggered by the assassination of Stjepan Radić, King Alexander abolished the Vidovdan Constitution on 6 January 1929, prorogued the Parliament, and introduced a personal dictatorship (the so-called "January 6th Dictatorship", Šestojanuarska diktatura). One of the first acts of the new regime was to carry out a purge of the civil service, with one-third of civil servants being dismissed by May 1929 in an attempt to address popular complaints about rampant corruption in the bureaucracy. On 3 October, he also changed the name of the country to the Kingdom of Yugoslavia and replaced its 33 oblasts with nine new banovinas. Of the banovinas, only one had a Slovene majority, two had Croat majorities, and the rest had Serb majorities, which especially angered the Bosnian Muslims, who were left in a minority in every banovina.

Because the banovinas were drawn along new borders that did not correspond to historical regional boundaries, the reorganisation caused considerable resentment, especially in Bosnia and Croatia. In a bid to weaken regional loyalties, the banovinas were named after geographical features rather than historical regions and were governed by bans appointed by the King. In the same month, he tried to banish by decree the use of Serbian Cyrillic to promote the exclusive use of the Latin alphabet in Yugoslavia.

Alexander replaced the three regional flags of the Kingdom of Serbs, Croats and Slovenes with a single flag for the entire country, introduced a uniform legal code for his realm, imposed a unified fiscal code so that all of his subjects would pay the same tax rate, and established a Yugoslav Agrarian Bank by merging all of the regional agrarian banks into one. Alexander tried to promote a sense of Yugoslav identity by always taking his vacations in Slovenia, naming his second son after a Croat king, and serving as godfather to a Bosnian Muslim child. Alexander had once fraternised frequently with ordinary citizens, being known for his habit of making unannounced visits to villages across Yugoslavia to chat with locals, but after the proclamation of the royal dictatorship his social circle shrank to a few generals and courtiers, causing the King to lose touch with his subjects.

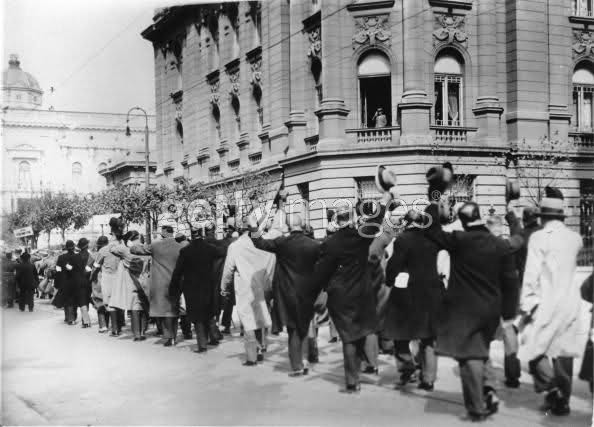
King Alexander I salutes Serbian war veterans from the palace window in Belgrade in 1931.

Within Serbia, the royal dictatorship made Alexander an unpopular figure for the first time. The British historian Richard Crampton wrote that many Serbs "...were alienated by the attempt, albeit unsuccessful, to lessen the Serbian domination on which, to add insult to injury, many of the faults of the previous system were blamed. Alexander had implicitly made the Serbs, the most reliable proponents of centralism, the villains of the Vidovdan piece". The royal dictatorship was seen in Croatia as merely a form of Serbian domination, and one result was a marked upswing in support for the fascistic Ustaše, which advocated winning Croat independence through violence.

By 1931, the Ustaše were waging a terrorist campaign of bombings, assassinations, and sabotage, which at least in part explained Alexander's reluctance to engage with the public as he had done in the past, out of fear of assassination. On 14 February 1931, Alexander visited Zagreb, and the men of the Turopolje district, who for centuries had always provided a mounted honour guard for any royal visitor to Zagreb, failed to appear—a snub that showed how unpopular Alexander had become in Croatia. On 19 February 1931, the Croat historian Milan Šufflay was murdered by police agents, becoming an international cause célèbre, with Albert Einstein and Heinrich Mann leading a campaign to pressure Alexander to prosecute Šufflay's killers.

The Great Depression was especially severe in predominantly rural Yugoslavia, as it caused deflation that led to a collapse in the prices of agricultural products. Ante Trumbić summed up the feelings of many when he gave a speech in early 1931 stating: "We are in a crisis, an economic, financial and moral crisis. There is no material or moral credit in the country. Nobody believes anything anymore!" However, Alexander remained unperturbed, stating in an interview with the press: "Yugoslav politics will never again be driven by narrow religious, regional or national interests". Pressure from Yugoslavia's allies, especially France and Czechoslovakia, led Alexander to ease the royal dictatorship by introducing a new constitution that allowed the parliament to meet again.

=== Restoration of constitution ===
In 1931, Alexander decreed a new constitution that transferred executive power to the King. Elections were to be by universal male suffrage. The provision for a secret ballot was dropped, and pressure on public employees to vote for the governing party became a feature of all elections held under Alexander's constitution. Furthermore, the King could appoint half of the upper house directly, and legislation could become law with the approval of one of the houses alone if it were also approved by the King. The 1931 constitution kept Yugoslavia as a unitary state, which enraged the non-Serb peoples, who demanded a federation and saw Alexander's royal dictatorship as thinly disguised Serbian domination. In the parliamentary elections of December 1931 – January 1932, the opposition parties' call to boycott the vote was widely heeded, a sign of popular dissatisfaction with the new constitution.

In response to the impoverishment of the countryside caused by the Great Depression, Alexander reaffirmed in a speech the right of every peasant family to a minimum amount of land that could not be seized by a bank in the event of a debt default. In 1932, he issued a decree suspending all debt payments by farmers to banks for six months and forbade any further bank foreclosures against farmers. Alexander's measures preventing banks from foreclosing on farmers who were unable to pay their loans saved many peasants from ruin and prevented economic distress in the countryside from turning political, but in the long run his policies did not solve the economic problems of the rural areas. The losses suffered by the banks and their inability to foreclose on delinquent loans made them unwilling to issue new loans to farmers. As Yugoslav agriculture, especially in the southern parts of the country, was underdeveloped, farmers needed loans to modernise their holdings, but the banks' unwillingness to lend made agricultural modernisation impossible in the 1930s.

In September 1932, Ante Trumbić gave an interview to The Manchester Guardian in which he stated that life for ordinary Croats had been better when they were part of the Austro-Hungarian Empire and suggested that perhaps the Croats would be better off if they broke away from Yugoslavia to form their own state. This public expression of scepticism towards the unitary arrangement of Yugoslavia was a bitter blow for Alexander, who had always respected and liked Trumbić. On 7 November 1932, Trumbić and Vladko Maček of the Croatian Peasant Party issued the Zagreb Points, which demanded a new constitution that would turn Yugoslavia into a federation and stated that the Croats would otherwise demand independence.

Alexander had Maček imprisoned without charges, but the issuing of the Zagreb Points inspired other peoples to issue similar declarations, with the Slovenes issuing the Ljubljana Points, the Bosnian Muslims issuing the Sarajevo Points, and the Magyars issuing the Novi Sad Points. The emergence of a multi-ethnic opposition movement embracing the non-Serb peoples threatened to break the country apart and forced Alexander to ease the level of repression, as his ministers warned him that he could not imprison the entire country.

In Macedonia, the Internal Macedonian Revolutionary Organisation (IMRO) continued its long-running guerrilla struggle, while in Croatia the security situation had further deteriorated by 1932. By the end of 1932, the Ustaše had blown up hundreds of trains and assassinated hundreds of government officials. The often violent response of the mainly Serb gendarmes to Ustaše terrorism fuelled further support for the Ustaše. To many, it appeared that Yugoslavia was sliding into the very civil war that Alexander's "self-coup" of January 1929 was supposed to prevent.

=== Foreign policy ===
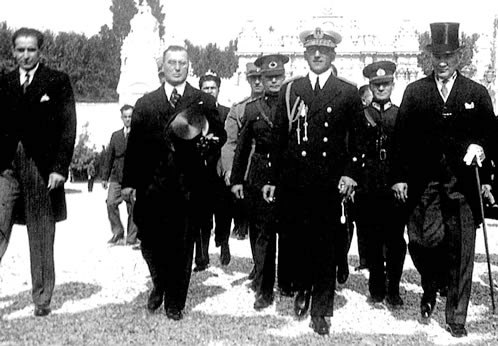
King Alexander I of Yugoslavia and Mustafa Kemal Atatürk, the first President of the Republic of Turkey, in 1933

Starting in 1933, Alexander became worried about Nazi Germany. In March 1933, the French minister in Belgrade, Paul-Émile Naggiar, told Alexander that France was seriously concerned about the stability of Yugoslavia, warning that the King could not continue to rule in the face of opposition from the majority of his subjects and that Paris was starting to view Alexander as a liability. Naggiar predicted that the new regime in Germany would challenge the international order created by the Treaty of Versailles sooner or later and that France needed Yugoslavia to be stable and strong, which led him to advise the King to adopt federalism for his realm.

One point of agreement between Alexander and Mussolini was their shared fear of the unification of Germany and Austria, which would make Germany a direct neighbour of Yugoslavia. Alexander had no desire to have Germany as a neighbour, which led him to support the continuation of Austrian independence. Despite his distaste for communism, the King gave support, albeit in a very cautious and hesitant way, to the plans of French Foreign Minister Louis Barthou to bring the Soviet Union into a front meant to contain Germany. In 1933–1934, Alexander became a proponent of an alliance between Yugoslavia, Greece, Romania, and Turkey, which was achieved in 1934 with the creation of the Balkan Pact.

Although the Balkan Pact was directed primarily against Italy and its allies (Hungary, Albania, and Bulgaria), Alexander hoped the pact might provide some protection against Germany. After the coup d'état in May 1934 in Sofia, Alexander hoped that Bulgaria would also join the pact. The new Bulgarian government had begun suppressing the IMRO. In September 1934, Alexander visited Sofia to improve relations with Bulgaria. The Bulgarian political organisation that had taken power in the 1934 coup, Zveno, supported the unification of Bulgaria and Albania with Yugoslavia, which aligned with Alexander's policy of "the Balkans for the Balkan peoples".

== Assassination ==
Assassination of Alexander I of Yugoslavia
- Part of the interwar period
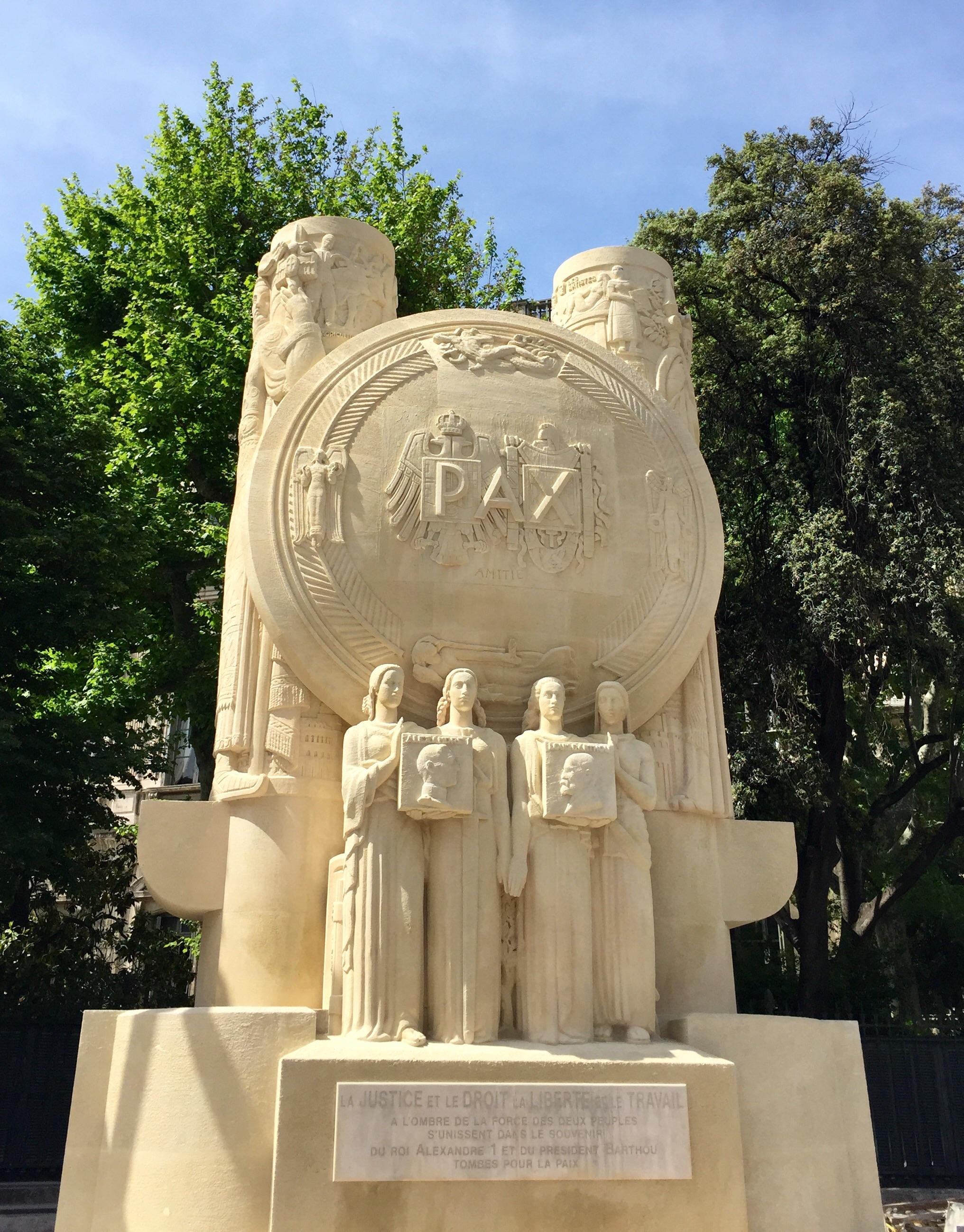
- A monument to King Alexander I and French Foreign Minister Louis Barthou in Marseille, France.
- Date: October 9, 1934
- Location: Marseille, France
- Type: Assassination, shootout, attempted murder–suicide
- Perpetrator: IMRO
- Organized by: Kingdom of Italy (allegedly)
- Filmed by: Universal Pictures
- Participants: 5
- Outcome: Alexander dies from gunshot wounds; The assassin, Vlado Chernozemski, is beaten by the crowd and dies in police custody; Peter II takes the Yugoslav throne with Alexander's first cousin, Prince Paul, as regent; The four accomplices are released by Nazi Germany following the Fall of France in 1940
- Deaths: 7 (Note: Alexander and the chauffeur were killed directly, Louis Barthou died after being fatally injured by a stray bullet, three civilians died after being fatally injured, and the assassin died from injuries after being beaten by the crowd.)
- Injuries: 10 (Note: Four of which were fatal)
- Arrests: 5 (Note: Vlado Chernozemski and four Ustaše militants)
- Sentence: Life imprisonment (Note: Excluding Vlado Chernozemski, who died in police custody; Ante Pavelić, Dido Kvaternik, and Ivan Perčević were sentenced to death in absentia.)
- Footage

After an attack by the Ustaše on a gendarmerie station in Velebit in November 1932, Alexander said through an intermediary to the Italian government: "If you want to have serious riots in Yugoslavia or cause a regime change, you need to kill me. Shoot at me and be sure you have finished me off, because that's the only way to make changes in Yugoslavia."

In 1934, French Foreign Minister Louis Barthou attempted to build an alliance meant to contain Nazi Germany, consisting of France's allies in Eastern Europe, such as Yugoslavia, together with Italy and the Soviet Union. The long-standing rivalry between Benito Mussolini and King Alexander had complicated Barthou's work, as Alexander complained about Italian territorial claims against his country and Italian support for Hungarian revisionism and the Croat Ustaše.

As long as France's ally Yugoslavia continued to have disputes with Italy, Barthou's plans for an Italo-French rapprochement would remain stillborn. During a visit to Belgrade in June 1934, Barthou promised the King that France would pressure Mussolini into signing a treaty under which he would renounce his claims against Yugoslavia. Alexander was sceptical of Barthou's plan, noting that hundreds of Ustaše were being sheltered in Italy and that Mussolini was rumoured to have financed an unsuccessful attempt by the Ustaše to assassinate him in December 1933.

Mussolini had come to believe that it was only Alexander's personality that held Yugoslavia together and that if the King were assassinated, Yugoslavia would descend into civil war, allowing Italy to annex certain regions of the country without fear of reprisal from France. However, France was Yugoslavia's closest ally, and Barthou invited Alexander for a visit to France to sign a Franco-Yugoslav agreement that would allow Barthou to "go to Rome with the certainty of success". Because three of his family members had previously died on a Tuesday, Alexander refused to undertake any public functions on that day of the week. On Tuesday, 9 October 1934, however, he had no choice, as he was arriving in Marseille to begin a state visit to France to strengthen the two countries' alliance in the Little Entente.

While Alexander was being driven slowly in a car through the streets with Barthou, a Bulgarian assassin, Vlado Chernozemski, stepped into the street and shot the King twice, as well as the chauffeur, with a Mauser C96 semi-automatic pistol. Alexander died in the car, slumped backwards in the seat with his eyes open. Barthou was also killed by a stray bullet mistakenly fired by French police during the scuffle following the attack. Lieutenant-Colonel Jules Piollet struck the assailant with his sword. Ten people in the procession were wounded, including General Alphonse Georges, who was hit by two bullets as he tried to intervene. Nine people in the crowd that had come to see the King were wounded, four of them fatally.

It was one of the first assassinations to be captured on film; the shooting occurred in front of a newsreel cameraman, who was only metres away at the time. While the exact moment of the shooting was not captured on film, the events leading up to the assassination and the immediate aftermath were. The body of the mortally wounded chauffeur, Foissac, slumped and jammed against the brakes of the car, allowing the cameraman to continue filming from within inches of the King for several minutes afterwards. A 20th Century Fox newsreel presented by Graham McNamee was later manipulated to give audiences the impression that the shooting itself had been captured on film.

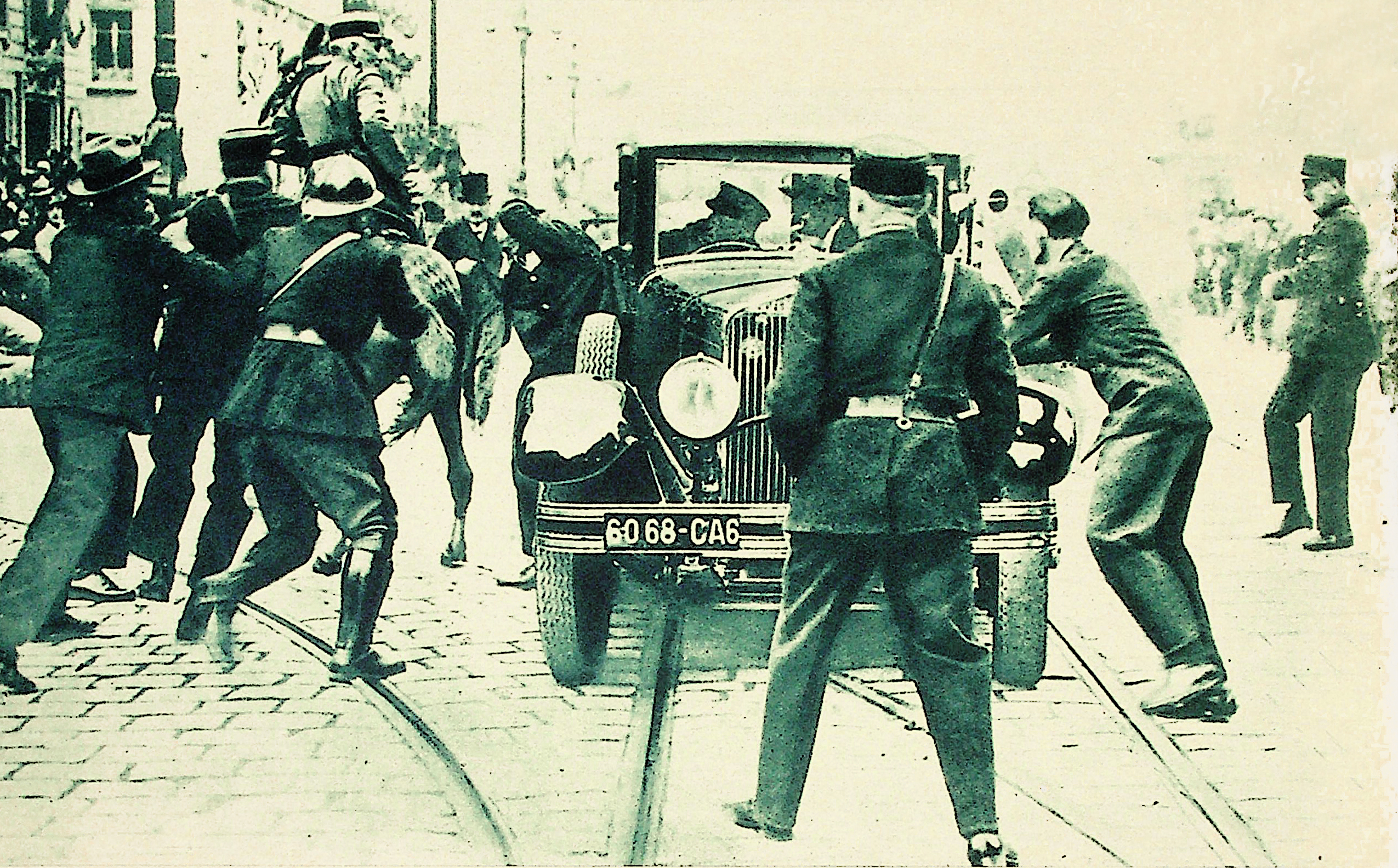
Photograph of the assassination of King Alexander I

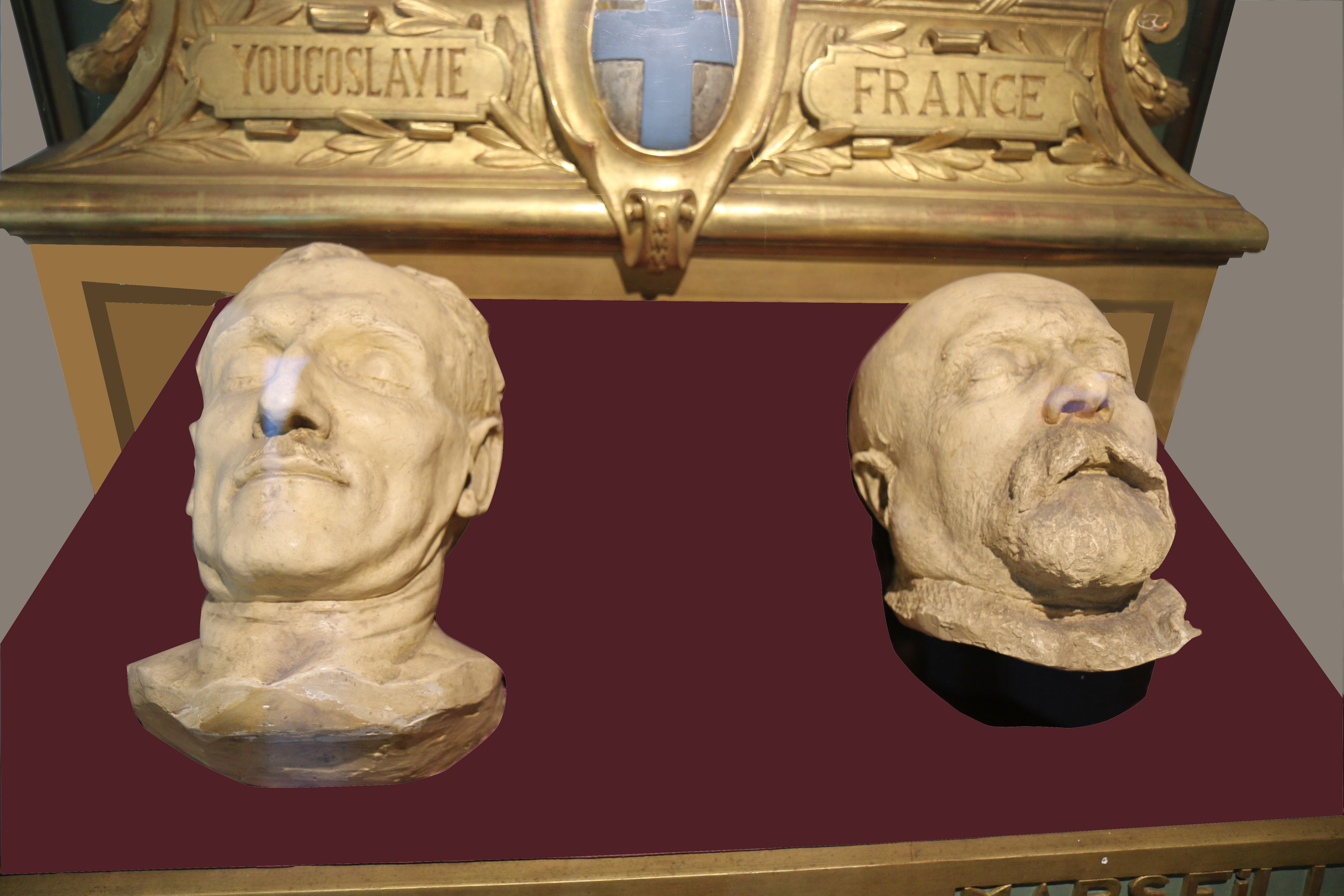
The death masks of Alexander I and Louis Barthou

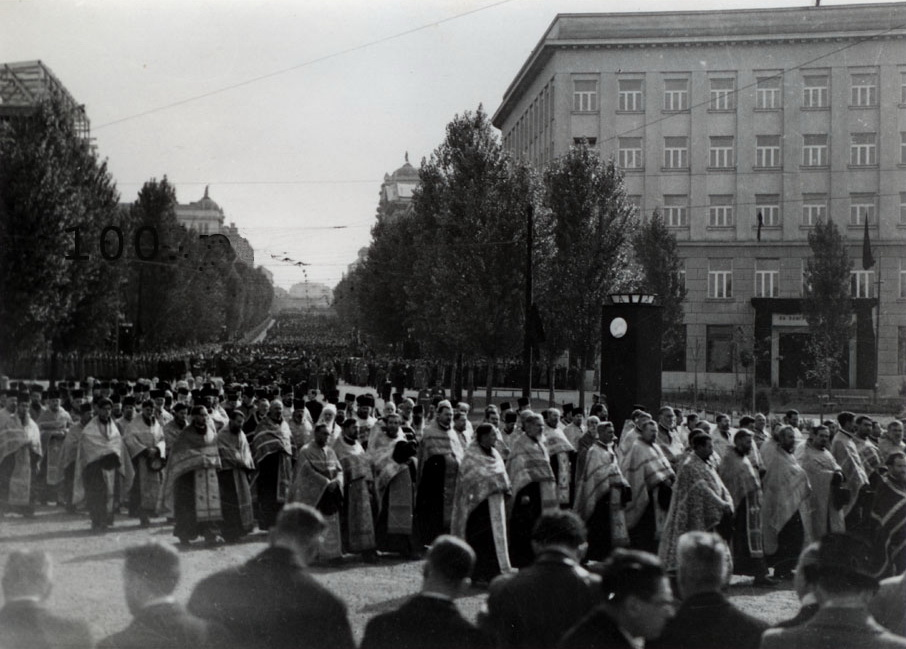
The funeral of King Alexander in Belgrade

The assassin, who died in police custody hours after the shooting, was a member of the pro-Bulgarian Internal Macedonian Revolutionary Organisation (IMRO or VMRO) and an experienced marksman. The IMRO was a political organisation that fought for the independence of Macedonia, initially as a second Bulgarian state, followed by eventual unification with the Kingdom of Bulgaria.

The IMRO worked in alliance with the Ustaše, led by Ante Pavelić. Chernozemski and three Croatian accomplices had travelled to France from Hungary via Switzerland. After the assassination, Chernozemski's accomplices were arrested by French police. A prominent Italian diplomat, Baron Pompeo Aloisi, expressed fears that Ustaše members based in Italy had killed the King and sought reassurances from another diplomat, Paolo Cortese, that Italy had not been involved. Aloisi was not reassured when Cortese told him that with Alexander dead, Yugoslavia was about to break up.

Public opinion and the press in Yugoslavia held that Italy had been crucial in planning and directing the assassination. Demonstrators outside the Italian embassy in Belgrade and the Italian consulates in Zagreb and Ljubljana blamed Mussolini for Alexander's assassination. An investigation by the French police quickly established that the assassins had been trained and armed in Hungary, had travelled to France on forged Czechoslovak passports, and had frequently telephoned Ustaše leader Ante Pavelić, who was living in Italy.

The incident was later used by Yugoslavia as an argument to counter Croatian attempts at secession as well as Italian and Hungarian revisionism. The accomplices in the assassination were Ivan Rajić, Mijo Kralj, Zvonimir Pospišil, and Antun Godina. They were sentenced to life in prison, although the Yugoslav authorities had expected that they would be sentenced to death. In 1940, after the fall of France, they were released from prison by Germany.

Pierre Laval, who succeeded Barthou as foreign minister, wished to continue the rapprochement with Rome and saw the assassinations in Marseille as an inconvenience that was best forgotten. Both London and Paris made it clear that they regarded Mussolini as a responsible European statesman and privately told Belgrade that under no circumstances would they allow Il Duce to be blamed. In a speech in Northampton, England, on 19 October 1934, British Foreign Secretary Sir John Simon expressed his sympathy to the people of Yugoslavia over the King's assassination and stated that he was convinced by Mussolini's speech in Milan denying involvement in the assassination.

When Yugoslavia submitted an extradition request to Italy for Pavelić on charges of regicide, the Quai d'Orsay expressed concern that if Pavelić were extradited, he might incriminate Mussolini, and was greatly reassured when its counterparts at the Palazzo Chigi stated that there was no possibility of Pavelić being extradited. Laval cynically told a French journalist off the record that the French press should stop dwelling on the assassinations in Marseille because France would never go to war to defend the honour of a weak country like Yugoslavia.

The following day, the body of King Alexander I was transported back to the port of Split in Yugoslavia by the destroyer JRM Dubrovnik. After a huge funeral in Belgrade attended by about 500,000 people and many leading European statesmen, Alexander was interred in the Oplenac Church in Topola, which had been built by his father. The Holy See gave special permission to bishops Aloysius Stepinac, Antun Akšamović, Dionisije Njaradi, and Gregorij Rožman to attend the funeral in an Orthodox church. As his son, King Peter II, was still a minor, Alexander's first cousin Prince Paul assumed the regency of the Kingdom of Yugoslavia.

A ballistic report on the bullets found in the car was compiled in 1935, but its results were not made available to the public until 1974. It revealed that Barthou had been hit by an 8 mm Modèle 1892 revolver round commonly used in weapons carried by French police.

After the assassination, relations between Yugoslavia and France cooled and never returned to their previous level. Furthermore, the Little Entente and the Balkan Pact declined in importance. The Yugoslav public was shocked that the assassination had taken place on French soil. In the following years, Prince Paul, acting as regent, attempted to maintain a neutral balance between London and Berlin until 1941, when he yielded to heavy pressure to join the Tripartite Pact.

== Issue ==
Name	Birth	Death	Spouse	Children
King Peter II	6 September 1923	3 November 1970	Princess Alexandra of Greece and Denmark	Crown Prince Alexander (b. 1945)
Prince Tomislav	19 January 1928	12 July 2000	Princess Margarita of Baden; Divorced 1981	Prince Nikola (b. 1958); Princess Katarina (b. 1959)
Prince Tomislav	19 January 1928	12 July 2000	Linda Mary Bonney	Prince George (b. 1984); Prince Michael (b. 1985)
Prince Andrew	28 June 1929	7 May 1990	Princess Christina Margarethe of Hesse; Divorced 1962	Princess Maria Tatiana (b. 1957); Prince Christopher (1960–1994)
Prince Andrew	28 June 1929	7 May 1990	Princess Kira Melita of Leiningen; Divorced 1972	Princess Lavinia Maria (b. 1961); Prince Karl Vladimir (b. 1964); Prince Dimitri (b. 1965)
Prince Andrew	28 June 1929	7 May 1990	Eva Maria Andjelkovich	

== In literature and popular culture ==
- Rebecca West's travel book Black Lamb and Grey Falcon opens with the author's anxiety over the assassination, which she hears about while recovering from surgery and then discusses with an uninformed nurse. This prompts a meditation on the manifest and latent impacts of prior assassinations on world events. Later, she describes a newsreel of the assassination in detail.
- In Upton Sinclair's historical novel Wide Is the Gate (the fourth novel in the Lanny Budd series, published in 1941), the assassination is attributed to the Nazi German government. The novel claims that the Croatian assassin obtained funds and a forged passport from the head of the German foreign policy department.
- The song "Don Juan" by the British synth-pop duo Pet Shop Boys (the B-side to their 1988 single "Domino Dancing") contains the lyrics "King Zog's back from holiday, Marie Lupescu's grey and King Alexander is dead in Marseille".
- Ivan Vazov's poem "Па ща си ти?" ("What are you?") depicts the incident in which Crown Prince Alexander asks a little girl from Skopje her nationality and slaps her in the face when she answers, "I'm Bulgarian." The poem emphasises the suffering of the Macedonian Bulgarians under Serbian rule.
- A heavily fictionalised version of the assassination serves as the opening to the novel The Second Assassin by Christopher Hyde. The gunman is changed to a Croat, while an Irish hitman kills both him and Barthou using a rifle, undetected in the confusion. The plot is depicted as having been masterminded by Nazi Germany to eliminate both Alexander and Barthou at the same time.
- The 2021 television series Alexander of Yugoslavia, directed by Zdravko Šotra, depicts his life and reign.

== Honours ==
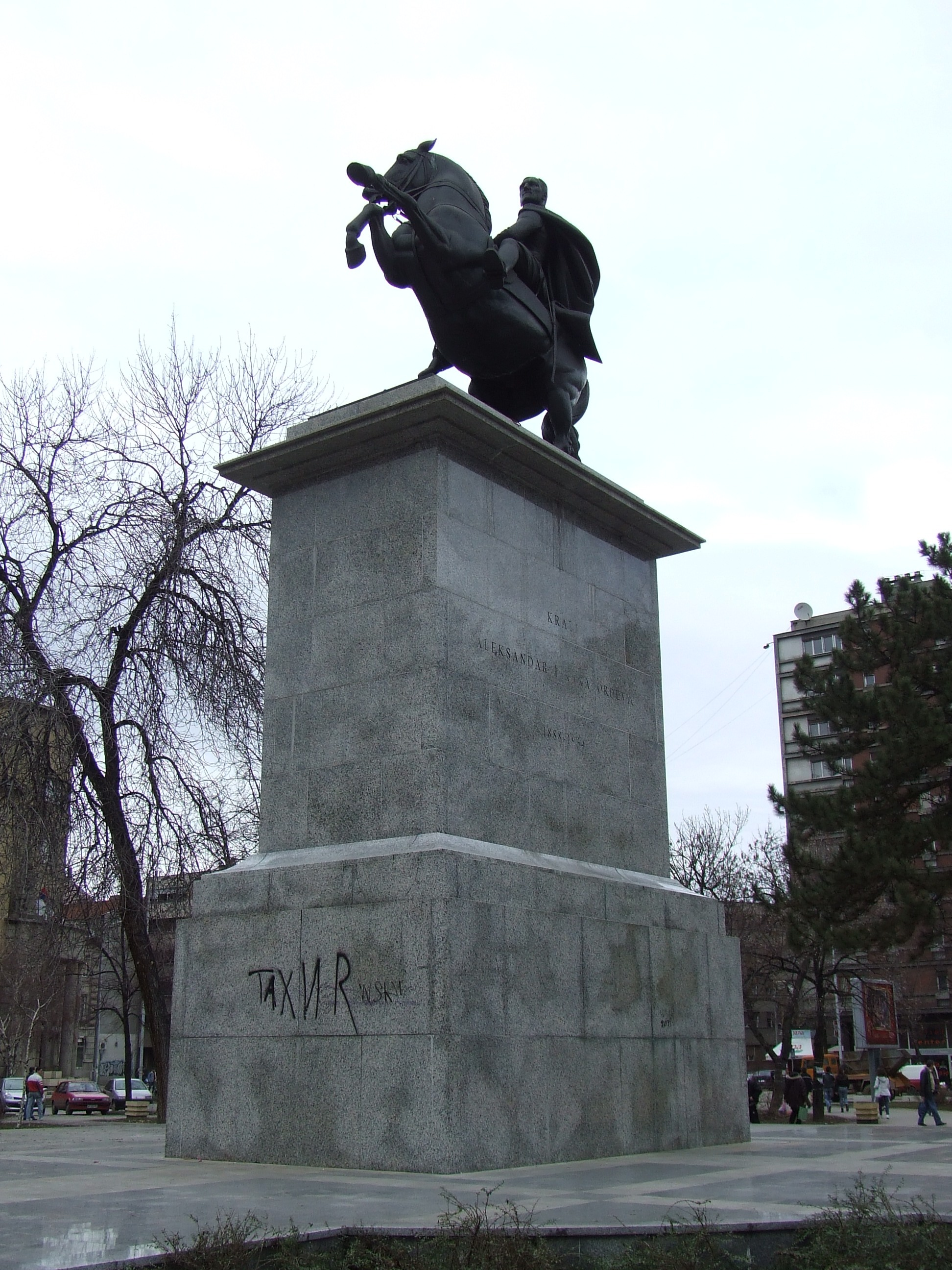
Monument to Alexander the Unifier in Niš, Serbia

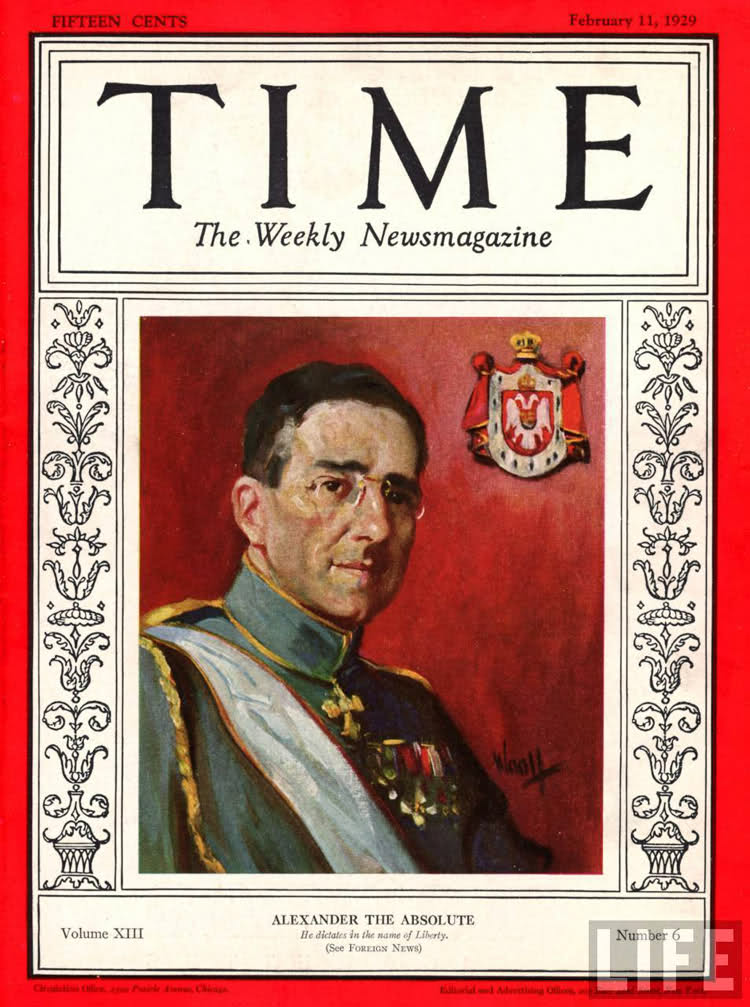
King Alexander on the cover of Time on 11 February 1929

Serbian and Yugoslavian military decorations
Order of Saint Prince Lazarus, Collar (Royal Order only)
Order of Karađorđe's Star, Grand Master
Order of the White Eagle, Grand Master
Order of Karađorđe's Star with Swords, Grand Master
Order of the White Eagle with Swords, Grand Master
Order of the Yugoslav Crown, Grand Master
Order of Saint Sava, Grand Master
Serbian service medals
Gold Bravery Medal, 1912
Gold Bravery Medal, 1913
Commemorative Medal of the First Balkan War, 1912
Commemorative Medal of the Second Balkan War, 1913
Commemorative Medal of the Election of Peter I as King of Serbia
Commemorative Medal of the Albanian Campaign
International and foreign awards
Order of Leopold, Grand Cordon (Belgium)
War Cross 1914–1918 (Belgium)
Order of Saints Cyril and Methodius, Collar (Bulgaria)
Order of St. Alexander with Swords, Collar (Bulgaria)
Order of the White Lion, Collar (Czechoslovakia)
War Cross 1914–1918 (Czechoslovakia)
Order of the Elephant, Grand Cross (Denmark)
Legion of Honour, Grand Cross (France)
Médaille militaire (France)
War Cross 1914–1918 (France)
Order of the Redeemer, Grand Cross (Greece)
War Cross 1914–1918 (Greece)
Supreme Order of the Most Holy Annunciation, Collar (Italy)
Order of Saints Maurice and Lazarus, Knight Grand Cross (Italy)
Order of the Crown of Italy, Knight Grand Cross (Italy)
Military Order of Savoy, Knight Grand Cross (Italy)
Order of the Wendish Crown, Grand Cross (Mecklenburg)
Order of Saint Peter of Cetinje, Knight (Montenegro)
Order of Prince Danilo I, Knight Grand Cross (Montenegro)
Order of the Orthodox Church of Jerusalem, Knight of the Collar (Orthodox Church of Jerusalem)
Order of Distinction, 1st class (Ottoman Empire)
Order of the Sun of Peru, Grand Cross (Peru)
Virtuti Militari, Grand Cross (Poland)
Order of the White Eagle, Grand Cross (Poland)
Order of Polonia Restituta, Grand Cross (Poland)
Sash of the Three Orders, Grand Cross (Portugal)
Order of the Tower and Sword, Grand Cross (Portugal)
Order of Michael the Brave, 1st class (Romania)
Order of Carol I, Knight Grand Cross with Collar (Romania)
Order of St. Andrew, Collar (Russia)
Order of St. Alexander Nevsky (Russia)
Order of the White Eagle, Grand Cross (Russia)
Order of St. George, 3rd class (Russia)
Order of St. George, 4th class (Russia)
Order of St. Anna, 1st class (Russia)
Order of St. Stanislaus, 1st class (Russia)
Order of the White Elephant, Knight Grand Cordon (Siam)
Order of the Bath, Knight Grand Cross (United Kingdom)
Royal Victorian Order, Honorary Knight Grand Cross (United Kingdom)
King George V Coronation Medal (United Kingdom)

== References and notes ==
=== Bibliography ===
- Acović, Dragomir (2012). Slava i čast: Odlikovanja među Srbima, Srbi među odlikovanjima. Belgrade: Službeni Glasnik.
- Crampton, Richard (1997). Eastern Europe in the Twentieth Century – And After. London: Routledge. ISBN 978-0415164238.
- DiNardo, Richard L. (2015). Invasion: The Conquest of Serbia, 1915. Santa Barbara: Praeger. ISBN 978-1440800924.
- Farley, Brigit (2007). "King Aleksandar and the Royal Dictatorship in Yugoslavia". In Bernd J. Fischer (ed.). Balkan Strongmen: Dictators and Authoritarian Rulers of Southeastern Europe. Central European Studies. West Lafayette, IN. pp. 51–86.
- Gligorijević, Branislav (2010). Kralj Aleksandar I Karađorđević. Beograd: Zavod za udžbenike i nastavna sredstva. 3 vols.
- Hastings, Max (2013). Catastrophe: Europe Goes to War 1914. London: William Collins.
- Kovrig, Bennett (January 1976). "Mediation by Obfuscation: The Resolution of the Marseille Crisis, October 1934 to May 1935". The Historical Journal. 19 (1): 191–221. doi:10.1017/S0018246X00018367. S2CID 153681564.
- Marković, Marko (2003). Povijest Crne legije: Jure i Boban (in Croatian).
- Passmore, Kevin (2003). Women, Gender, and Fascism in Europe, 1919–45. Manchester University Press. ISBN 0719060834.
- Seton-Watson, Robert (January 1935). "King Alexander's Assassination: Its Background and Effects". International Affairs. 14 (1): 20–47.
- Strachan, Hew (2006). The First World War – A New Illustrated History. Pocket Books. ISBN 074323961X.

Alexander I of Yugoslavia House of Karađorđević Born: 16 December 1888 Died: 9 October 1934
Regnal titles
Preceded by Peter I	King of the Serbs, Croats, and Slovenes; 16 August 1921 – 3 October 1929	Proclaimed King of Yugoslavia
New title	King of Yugoslavia; 3 October 1929 – 9 October 1934	Succeeded by Peter II
