= Desmond de Silva (barrister) =

British international lawyer (1939–2018)

Sir George Desmond Lorenz de Silva, QC, KStJ (13 December 1939 – 2 June 2018) was a British criminal law barrister and international lawyer who served as the United Nations Chief War Crimes Prosecutor in Sierra Leone.

== Early life ==
Desmond de Silva was Sri Lankan by birth, and comes from a family of lawyers. He was the son of Fredrick de Silva, formerly Ceylon's ambassador to France and Switzerland, and his wife Esme Gregg de Silva; a grandson of George E. de Silva; and a second cousin of Lasantha Wickrematunge.

Educated at Dulwich College Preparatory School, London, and Trinity College, Kandy, Sri Lanka, de Silva trained as a barrister at the Middle Temple, London.

== Career ==
De Silva was called to the bar from the Middle Temple in 1964, and was appointed a Queen's Counsel in 1984. A member of the Criminal Bar Association and the International Association of Prosecutors, he became one of the highest-profile criminal Queen's Counsel in England. In 2002, the UN Secretary-General Kofi Annan appointed him as Deputy Prosecutor for the Special Court for Sierra Leone, at the level of an Assistant Secretary-General, and in 2005 promoted him to the post of Chief Prosecutor at the higher level of Under Secretary-General. Silva brought about the arrest of Charles Taylor, former President of Liberia, who was convicted of war crimes at the Hague in 2011.

In 2003, de Silva was sent as an envoy by the United Nations Development Programme to Belgrade to persuade Prime Minister Vojislav Kostunica and his government to surrender indicted war criminals. He became a senior associate member of St Antony's College, Oxford, and a Bencher of the Honourable Society of the Middle Temple. De Silva's legal expertise included war crimes, crimes against humanity, espionage, treason, drugs, terrorism, human rights, white-collar fraud and sports law. His clients included John Terry, Lee Bowyer, Buzz Aldrin, Harry Redknapp, Ron Atkinson, Hans Segers, Lawrence Dallaglio, Graham Rix and Jamie Osborne. De Silva was a member of the Governing Council of the Manorial Society.

In October 2011, with the approval of Prime Minister David Cameron, de Silva was appointed to head a Review into collusion by the security services and other agencies of the state into the 1989 murder of the high-profile Belfast lawyer Pat Finucane. The report was published on 12 December 2012, and acknowledged "a willful and abject failure by successive Governments"; however, Finucane's family called the de Silva report a "sham". In 2019 the Supreme Court ruled that the official investigation into the Finucane murder was ineffective and failed to meet the required human rights standards.

On 23 July 2010, he was appointed by the United Nations Human Rights Council to investigate Israel's interception of a Gaza-bound flotilla in international waters that led to 9 deaths. In 2014, he was Chairman of an Inquiry into torture and executions of detainees in Syria. The Report produced went before the Geneva 11 Peace Talks into the civil war in Syria. On 10 January 2016, a Senior Army Commander complained about a "witch hunt" against British soldiers who were Iraq War veterans by pursuing frivolous legal claims. De Silva agreed with the Army Chief by saying, "Up to now nobody has got these ambulance-chasing lawyers by the scruff of the neck."

== Personal life and death ==
He married Princess Katarina of Yugoslavia on 5 December 1987. She was the daughter of Prince Tomislav of Yugoslavia and Princess Margarita of Baden, a granddaughter of King Alexander I of Yugoslavia and a great-great-great-granddaughter of Queen Victoria. They had one daughter, Victoria Marie Esmé Margarita, born on 6 September 1991. They divorced on 6 May 2010. He had one sister, Helga de Silva, whose son Detmar Blow was married to the late Isabella Blow.

Sir Desmond de Silva died on 2 June 2018 after a stroke following elective heart surgery in November 2017.

== Honours ==
De Silva was knighted in the 2007 New Year Honours, and was also a Knight of the Most Venerable Order of Saint John and a Knight Commander of the Royal Order of Francis I. He was sworn in as a Member of the Privy Council of the United Kingdom in October 2011. On 22 August 2016, Alexander, Crown Prince of Yugoslavia awarded him with the Grand Cross of the Order of the White Eagle.
