= Temi Mwale =

British social entrepreneur and campaigner

Temi Mwale is a British social entrepreneur and campaigner, based in London. She founded The 4Front Project in 2012 (formerly called Get Outta The Gang), a youth-led social enterprise "to empower young people and communities to live free from violence".

Mwale grew up on Grahame Park, a housing estate in Colindale in the London Borough of Barnet, North West London where The 4Front Project is located. She is a graduate of law from the London School of Economics.

Mwale's fictional short film The Struggle (2014) premiered at artsdepot in North Finchley, London in January 2014.

== Awards ==
- 2014: Cosmopolitan Ultimate Women of the Year Awards, UK
- 2014: Points of Light award, Prime Minister's Office, 10 Downing Street, September 2014 winners
- 2014: IARS Peacemaker of the Year Award, The IARS International Institute, London
- 2015: Young Person of the Year (London), Young People of the Year Awards, London
- 2017: Forbes 30 Under 30 – Europe – Social Entrepreneurs 2017
- 2018: Young Community Leader of the Year award, Groundwork UK, Birmingham

== Filmography ==
- The Struggle (2014) – 10 minutes

== See also ==
- Gang
- Gangs in the United Kingdom
- Social exclusion
- Youth exclusion
