= Princess Katarina of Yugoslavia =

English businesswoman and member of the former Yugoslavian royal family

Princess Katarina
- Lady de Silva
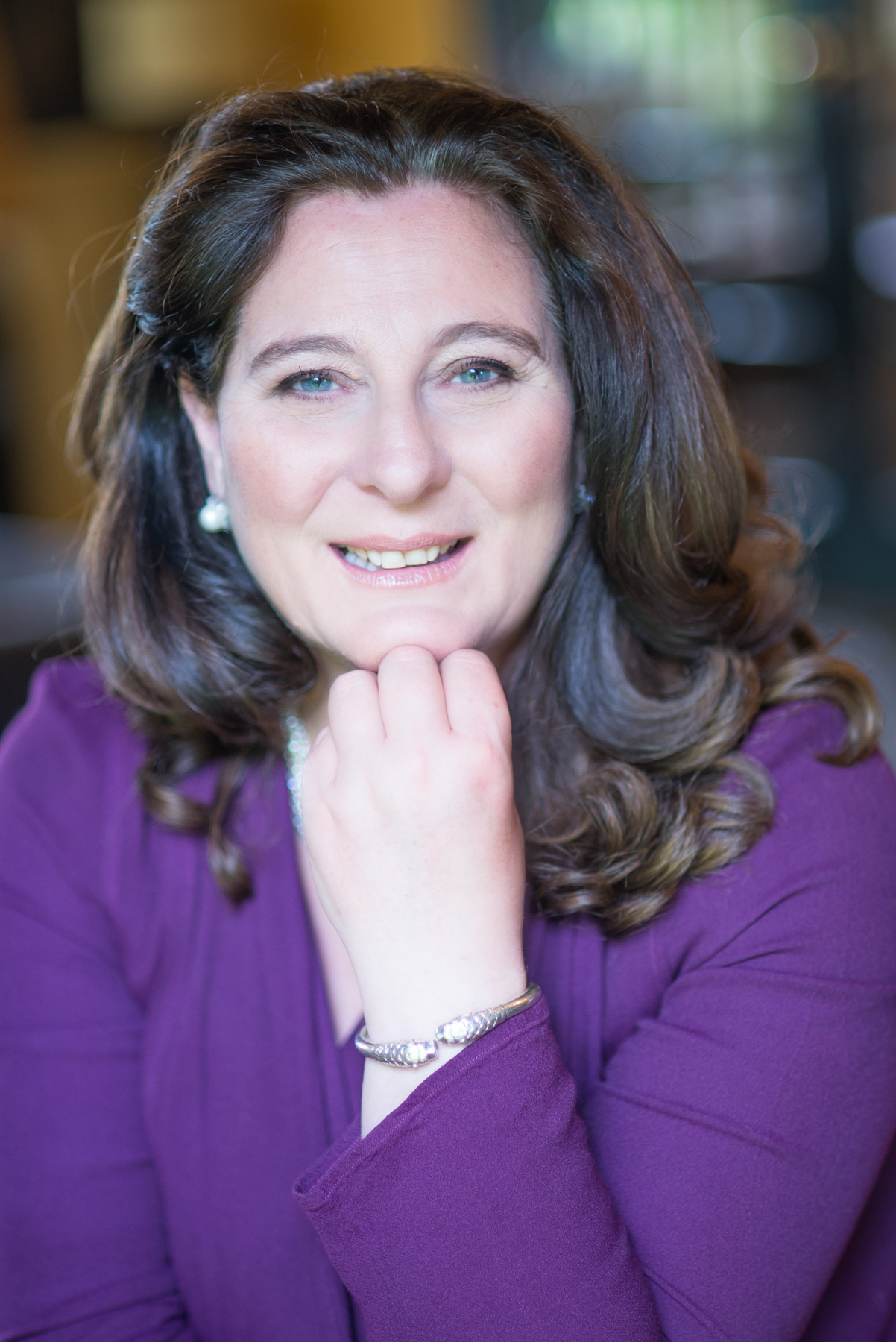
- Katarina in 2014
- Born: Katarina Karageorgevitch; 28 November 1959 (age 66); King's College Hospital, London, England
- Spouse: Sir Desmond de Silva (m. 1987; div. 2010)
- Issue: Victoria de Silva
- House: Karađorđević
- Father: Prince Tomislav of Yugoslavia
- Mother: Princess Margarita of Baden

Princess Katarina of Yugoslavia, Lady de Silva (born 28 November 1959) is an English businessperson specialising in etiquette and decorum courses. She is a member of the extended House of Karađorđević, the former royal family of the defunct Kingdom of Yugoslavia.

== Early life ==
Katarina was born at King’s College Hospital in London to Princess Margarita of Baden and Prince Tomislav of Yugoslavia. Her father's dynasty having been deposed and banished from Yugoslavia after World War II, she grew up in exile, largely in England. She has one brother, Prince Nikola of Yugoslavia, and two half-brothers, Prince George and Prince Michael. She is a first cousin of Alexander, Crown Prince of Yugoslavia. Her grandmother, Princess Theodora, Margravine of Baden, was the sister of Prince Philip, Duke of Edinburgh, late husband of Queen Elizabeth II. Princess Katharina is the senior female-line descendant of Queen Victoria, through the Queen's second daughter Alice, Grand Duchess of Hesse, who was the grandmother of Princess Katharina's great-grandmother, Princess Alice of Battenberg.

== Career ==
In 1978, Katarina was presented as a debutante to high society at the International Debutante Ball at the Waldorf-Astoria Hotel. As of 2013, Katarina and former Royal butler Grant Harrold develop and sell etiquette and decorum classes. In 2014, she became an ambassador for the Chinese tea company Yunnan Dianhong Group.

== Personal life ==
Katarina married barrister Sir Desmond de Silva on 5 December 1987. They had one daughter, Victoria Marie Esmé Margarita, born on 6 September 1991. They divorced on 6 May 2010.

=== Charity work ===
In 2009, Katarina supported the charity Project Change: Bermuda to raise funds towards building a hospital and training medical staff in Burundi. Katarina served as the president of the Guild of Travel and Tourism in the United Kingdom. She was a royal patron of the Queen Charlotte's Ball. In 2013, she became patron of the Society of Genealogists succeeding Prince Michael of Kent. In 2015, she became a trustee of the Katie Cutler Foundation, a charity in support of disabled mugging victim Alan Barnes.

== Honours ==
- (Kingdom of Yugoslavia) House of Karađorđević: Dame Grand Cross of the Royal Order of St. Sava
- (Kingdom of the Two Sicilies) House of Bourbon-Two Sicilies: Dames Grand Cross Royal Order of Francis I

== Ancestry ==
Katarina is a member of the House of Karađorđević. Through her father, Katarina descends from kings Nicholas I of Montenegro, Ferdinand I of Romania, and furthermore from Emperor Nicholas I of Russia, King Ferdinand II and Queen Maria II of Portugal, and Queen Victoria of the United Kingdom of Great Britain and Ireland.

Through her mother, Katarina descends from Leopold, Grand Duke of Baden, kings George V of Hanover, Christian IX of Denmark, George I of Greece and Nicholas I, Emperor of Russia.
