= Prince Tomislav of Yugoslavia =

Yugoslav prince (1928–2000)

Prince Tomislav
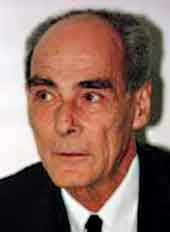
- Prince Tomislav, c. 1990s
- Born: 19 January 1928; Old Royal Palace, Belgrade, Kingdom of Serbs, Croats and Slovenes
- Died: 12 July 2000 (aged 72); Topola, Serbia, FR Yugoslavia
- Burial: St. George's Church
- Spouse: Princess Margarita of Baden (m. 1957; div. 1981) Linda Mary Bonney (m. 1982)
- Issue: Prince Nikola; Princess Katarina; Prince George; Prince Michael
- House: Karađorđević
- Father: Alexander I of Yugoslavia
- Mother: Maria of Romania
- Military career
- Allegiance: Kingdom of Yugoslavia
- Branch: Royal Yugoslav Navy
- Service years: 1944–1945
- Rank: Petty officer 1 class

Prince Tomislav of Yugoslavia (Serbian: Томислав Карађорђевић, Tomislav Karađorđević; 19 January 1928 – 12 July 2000) was a member of the House of Karađorđević, the second son of King Alexander I and Queen Maria of Yugoslavia. He was a younger brother of King Peter II of Yugoslavia and a former nephew-in-law to Queen Elizabeth II and Prince Philip.

== Early life and education ==
Prince Tomislav was born on 19 January 1928, on Epiphany according to the Julian calendar used by the Serbian Orthodox Church, at 1 am, as the second son of the sovereign of the then Kingdom of Serbs, Croats and Slovenes (later the Kingdom of Yugoslavia), Alexander I and Queen Maria, the second daughter of King Ferdinand of Romania and his wife Queen Marie.

He was baptized on 25 January in a salon of the New Palace in Belgrade, with the British Minister to the Yugoslav Court, Kennard, representing the godfather King George V, with water from the Vardar and Danube rivers and the Adriatic Sea. The Prince was named after Tomislav of Croatia, the King of medieval Croatia.

At the beginning of February 1928, a delegation was sent from Županjac (present-day Tomislavgrad) headed by the parish priest Šimun Ančić who handed Alexander the resolution in which the population of the Srez of Županjac asks him to change the name of the srez to Tomislavgrad, in honour of his son and Tomislav of Croatia. Not long after, Alexander granted them their petition but dropped Tomislav of Croatia from his decree.

He began his elementary education at the Belgrade Palace but in 1937 he started to attend Sandroyd School in Cobham, Surrey, and then, following the school's relocation, in Tollard Royal, Wiltshire. He stayed in the UK throughout World War II and after King Peter was deposed, moving on to Oundle School from 1941 to 1946 and Clare College, Cambridge, in 1946–1947, where he completed Part I of the economics tripos.

== Events in Yugoslavia ==
In 1934 when he was only six, Prince Tomislav's father, Alexander I, was assassinated and his elder brother Peter succeeded to the throne as King Peter II of Yugoslavia. As he was still only 11, because of his young age, a regency was established, headed by their father's cousin Prince Paul of Yugoslavia.

After initially declaring neutrality, on 25 March 1941, although King Peter and his advisors were opposed to Nazi Germany, the Regent, Prince Paul, under immense German pressure signed the Tripartite Pact originally signed by Germany, Italy, and Japan. Two days later, in a British-supported coup d'état opposing the Tripartite Pact, King Peter, then 17, was proclaimed of age, and the regency overthrown. Postponing Operation Barbarossa, Germany simultaneously attacked Yugoslavia and Greece. From 6 April Luftwaffe pounded Belgrade for three days and three nights, Operation Punishment. Within a week, Germany, Bulgaria, Hungary and Italy invaded Yugoslavia and the government was forced to surrender on 17 April. Yugoslavia was divided to satisfy Italian, Bulgarian, Hungarian and German demands and puppet Croat, Montenegrin and Serb states proclaimed.

King Peter was forced to leave the country with the Yugoslav government following the Axis invasion; initially the King went with his government to Greece, and Jerusalem, then to the British Mandate of Palestine and Cairo, Egypt. He went to England in June 1941, where he joined numerous other governments in exile from Nazi-occupied Europe. Local Yugoslav forces continued to resist the occupying Axis powers. Initially the monarchy preferred Draža Mihailović and his Serb-dominated Četnik resistance. However, in 1944, the Tito–Šubašić agreement recognised the Democratic Federal Yugoslavia as a provisional government, with the status of the monarchy to be decided at a later date. Three regents, Srđan Budisavljević, a Serb, Ante Mandić, a Croat, and Dušan Sernec, a Slovene, were sworn in at Belgrade on 3 March 1945. They appointed the new government, to be headed by Tito as prime minister and minister of war, with Šubašić as foreign minister, on 7 March.

On 29 November 1945, while still in exile, King Peter II was deposed by the constituent assembly. The Federal People's Republic of Yugoslavia was internationally recognized as Yugoslavia while Peter II became a pretender.

== Life in exile ==
After Cambridge, and not being able to return to Yugoslavia following the abolition of the monarchy, Prince Tomislav remained in the UK and devoted himself to fruit growing. While he attended agricultural college, he worked summers as an ordinary field hand in an orchard in Kent. In 1950, he bought a farm at Kirdford, near Petworth, in West Sussex, and subsequently specialized in growing apples, having at one point 17,000 trees on 80 hectares of land.

He supported the Serbian community and the Serbian Orthodox Church in the United Kingdom, helping found St Lazar's Church, Bournville where he married his second wife, Linda Bonney, in 1982.

== Death ==
He died after five years of illness on 12 July 2000, on Ss. Peter and Paul Day in the Julian Calendar, the patron saints of the family crypt on Oplenac, where he was buried, in a funeral attended by several thousand mourners.

== Marriage and issue ==
He was married on 5 June 1957, in Salem, Baden-Württemberg, West Germany, to Princess Margarita of Baden, niece of Prince Philip, Duke of Edinburgh. Tomislav and Margarita were divorced in 1981. They had two children:

- Prince Nikola of Yugoslavia (born 15 March 1958, London). He married to Ljiljana Licanin (b. 12 December 1957 in Zemun, Serbia) on 30 August 1992 in Denmark. They have a daughter:
  - Princess Marija (b. 31 August 1993, Belgrade).
- Princess Katarina of Yugoslavia (b. 28 November 1959, King's College Hospital, London). She was married for several years to Sir Desmond de Silva QC, KStJ (13 December 1939, Sri Lanka – 2 June 2018), and works in public relations. They have a daughter:
  - Victoria Marie Esmé Margarita de Silva (b. 6 September 1991).

On 16 October 1982, he married Linda Mary Bonney at the Serbian Orthodox Church of St Lazar, Bournville, Birmingham. They had two sons:

- Prince George of Yugoslavia (b. 25 May 1984 at Portland Hospital, London). He married Fallon Rayman (b. 5 September 1995 in Guildford, Surrey) on 5 July 2016 at Gretna Green.
- Prince Michael of Yugoslavia (b. 15 December 1985, London). He married Ljubica Ljubisavljević (b. 1989 in Belgrade) on 23 October 2016 at Oplenac. They have two daughters:
  - Princess Natalija of Yugoslavia (b. 26 December 2018, Belgrade).
  - Princess Isidora of Yugoslavia (b. 17 May 2022, Belgrade).

== Ancestry ==
Ancestors of Prince Tomislav of Yugoslavia

8. Alexander Karađorđević, Prince of Serbia
4. Peter I of Serbia
9. Persida Nenadović
2. Alexander I of Yugoslavia
10. Nicholas I of Montenegro
5. Zorka of Montenegro
11. Milena of Montenegro
1. Prince Tomislav of Yugoslavia
12. Leopold, Prince of Hohenzollern
6. Ferdinand I of Romania
13. Infanta Antónia of Portugal
3. Maria of Yugoslavia
14. Alfred, Duke of Saxe-Coburg and Gotha
7. Marie of Edinburgh
15. Grand Duchess Maria Alexandrovna of Russia

== Bibliography ==
- Krišto, Jure (2000). "Duvanjski kraj kroz povijest" [The region of Duvno through history]. In Krišto, Jure (ed.). Duvanjski zbornik [The collection of papers of Duvno] (in Croatian). Zagreb-Tomislavgrad: Hrvatski institut za povijest–Naša ognjišta–Zajednica Duvnjaka Tomislavgrad. ISBN 9536324253.

Prince Tomislav of Yugoslavia House of Karađorđević Born: 19 January 1928 Died: 12 July 2000
Yugoslavian royalty
Preceded by Peter II	Hereditary Prince of Yugoslavia; 9 October 1934 – 17 July 1945	Succeeded by Alexander
Titles in pretence
Preceded by Alexander	— TITULAR — Hereditary Prince of Yugoslavia; 3 November 1970 – 5 February 1980; Reason for succession failure: Kingdom abolished in 1945	Succeeded by Peter
