= Princess Margarita of Baden =

Princess of Baden and Yugoslavia

Princess Margarita
- Princess Tomislav of Yugoslavia
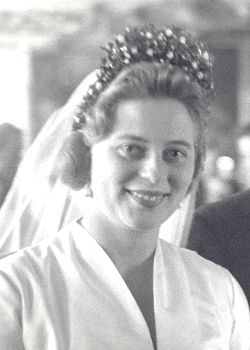
- Born: 14 July 1932; Schloss Salem, Baden-Württemberg, Weimar Republic
- Died: 15 January 2013 (aged 80); Farnham, Surrey, England
- Burial: Mimmenhausen Cemetery, Salem, Germany
- Spouse: Prince Tomislav of Yugoslavia (m. 1957; div. 1981)
- Issue: Prince Nikola; Princess Katarina
Names
- Margarete Alice Thyra Viktoria Marie Louise Scholastica
- House: Baden (by birth); Karađorđević (by marriage)
- Father: Berthold, Margrave of Baden
- Mother: Princess Theodora of Greece and Denmark

Princess Margarita of Baden (Margarete Alice Thyra Viktoria Marie Louise Scholastica; 14 July 1932 – 15 January 2013) was the only daughter of Berthold, Margrave of Baden, and Princess Theodora of Greece and Denmark. She was the eldest surviving cousin of King Charles III and eldest surviving niece of Queen Elizabeth II and Prince Philip, Duke of Edinburgh.

== Early life ==
Margarita was born on 14 July 1932 at Schloss Salem, Germany, and grew up there. She was the eldest child and only daughter of Berthold, Margrave of Baden, who ran a school jointly with Kurt Hahn, and Princess Theodora of Greece and Denmark, older sister of Prince Philip, Duke of Edinburgh. Margarita was the first great-great-great-granddaughter of Queen Victoria.

She came to live in London in 1948, and trained as a nurse at St Thomas' Hospital. During this time, she was often seen with her cousins Princess Christina of Hesse and Princess Beatrix of Hohenlohe-Langenburg. Beatrix was briefly engaged to Margarita's brother Prince Maximilian, and Christina became Margarita's future sister-in-law by marrying Prince Andrew of Yugoslavia. Also during this time, Margarita attended the 1953 coronation of her aunt, Queen Elizabeth II. While in London, she met Prince Tomislav, a member of the exiled Yugoslav royal family as a younger brother of the former King Peter II of Yugoslavia. Tomislav was a third cousin of Margarita's mother; both were great-great-grandchildren of Queen Victoria and Prince Albert. Margarita and Tomislav became engaged on 2 January 1956. She took part in the ship tour organized by King Paul of Greece and Queen Frederica in 1954, which became known as the "Cruise of the Kings" and was attended by over 100 royals from all over Europe.

== Marriage ==
On 5 June 1957 Margarita married Prince Tomislav of Yugoslavia, younger brother of the former King Peter II of Yugoslavia, in a civil ceremony in Salem followed by Lutheran and Serbian Orthodox church services on 6 June. She wore a "plain white corded silk dress with a V-neckline, long sleeves, and a full skirt, and an old family train" with an orange blossom garland. Her train was carried by her first cousins Princes Welf and George of Hanover. Prince Philip, Duke of Edinburgh (her maternal uncle), and King Simeon of Bulgaria were among the guests. From this marriage were born:

- Prince Nikola of Yugoslavia (born 15 March 1958, London); married to Ljiljana Licanin (b. 12 December 1957 in Zemun, Serbia) on 30 August 1992 in Denmark. They have a daughter:
  - Princess Marija (b. 31 August 1993, Belgrade).
- Princess Katarina of Yugoslavia (b. 28 November 1959, King's College Hospital, London). She was married for several years to Sir Desmond de Silva QC, KStJ (b. 13 December 1939 Sri Lanka), has a daughter and works in public relations. They have a daughter:
  - Victoria Marie Esmé Margarita de Silva (b. 6 September 1991).

The couple settled in the United Kingdom, running a fruit farm near Billingshurst in Sussex. They were divorced in 1981.

== Later years ==
Margarita was a champion of Serbian charities and was also president of the Convent of Martha and Mary in Moscow.

Margarita died on 15 January 2013 in Farnham, Surrey, after a long illness. Her funeral was held at Serbian Orthodox Church of Saint Sava in Notting Hill on 24 January 2013. Her uncle the Duke of Edinburgh, Queen Anne-Marie of Greece, and her nephew Alexander, Crown Prince of Yugoslavia, were among the mourners. Margarita was buried in the family cemetery at Stefansfeld near Baden, Germany, on 28 January 2013.

== Ancestry ==
Ancestors of Princess Margarita of Baden

8. Prince Wilhelm of Baden
4. Prince Maximilian of Baden
9. Princess Maria Maximilianovna of Leuchtenberg
2. Berthold, Margrave of Baden
10. Ernest Augustus, Crown Prince of Hanover
5. Princess Marie Louise of Hanover
11. Princess Thyra of Denmark
1. Princess Margarita of Baden
12. George I of Greece
6. Prince Andrew of Greece and Denmark
13. Grand Duchess Olga Constantinovna of Russia
3. Princess Theodora of Greece and Denmark
14. Prince Louis of Battenberg
7. Princess Alice of Battenberg
15. Princess Victoria of Hesse and by Rhine
