= Katie Cutler =

Katie Elizabeth Cutler BEM (born c. 1993) is a beautician from Gateshead who was awarded the British Empire Medal in the 2015 Birthday Honours for her fundraising for Alan Barnes. Cutler first came to prominence after she launched a fund-raising effort on Twitter to help pensioner Alan Barnes who had been the victim of a mugging, in January 2015. She has since formed the Katie Cutler foundation. This foundation is now defunct.

Legal issues and controversy

In 2016, Cutler lost a court case for unpaid publicity fees and was ordered to pay £6,200 to PR consultant Claire Barber. Barber said: "Katie could have sorted this out easily. I gave her a year to pay it back but at every point, instead of contacting me, she kept giving interviews to the media."

Cutler later stated she would use money from another online fundraising website to settle the debt and vowed never to undertake any more charity work.
