= Jan Nevole =

Austro-Hungarian architect

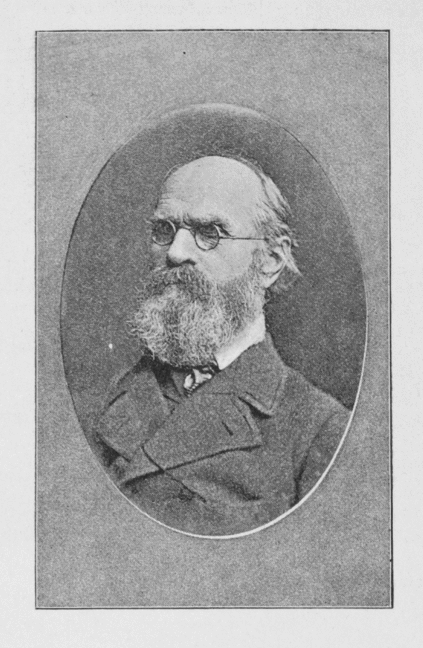
Portrait of Jan Nevole

Jan Nevole (15 April 1812 – 12 April 1903) was an Austro-Hungarian architect, active in Prague and Belgrade. He was a proponent of the Rundbogen style.

== Life ==
Nevole was born on 15 April 1812 in Víska in Bohemia, Austrian Empire. He attended the national school in Jihlava, then at a one-year school in Pardubice, the Academy of Fine Arts in Vienna (where, in addition to good technical skills, he also received an education in art), and finally at the Prague Polytechnic in 1826.

=== Early career ===
He started his career as an architect in Prague, where he worked in the Construction Directorate for four years, and then he collaborated with the builder Hošek in the design of the public bath St. Wenceslaus Spa, graduating from the Polytechnic (1930), he returned, participated in the construction of the Prague State Railway Station and built Helmingr's villa at the then Žitné brány.

=== Arrival in Serbia ===
After the stabilization of state conditions after the change of the dynasty, in 1843, an advertisement was published in Srpske novine in which "engineers" were sought. It is not known who applied or who was accepted, but after that announcement, the number of arrivals of engineers and architects in Belgrade was noticeably higher. Among them were two persons, perhaps the most important for the development of construction in Serbia in the period that followed: Jan Nevole and Emilijan Josimović.

When Janko Šafarik came to Prague with the task of bringing an engineer to Serbia who would manage construction there, he heard the most recommendations for Jan Nevole. He offered him the position of chief engineer and 800 thalers a year, to which Nevole agreed, regardless of his enviable reputation in Prague, and came to Belgrade in 1845 with his young wife. Here he built the family home and bought a vineyard in Mokri Lug. In Belgrade, Nevole got a job in the Ministry of Public Works, where the name of the architect was used for the first time, which sets Nevole apart from other state engineers. At the Engineering School in Topcider, the first institution (founded in 1846) of higher learning in the field of construction, Nevole taught drawing. In 1851, on his initiative to improve the state construction service and education, the Department of Construction was established at the Ministry of the Interior. In addition to the architect Jan Nevole, the chief engineer, engineers August Cerman, Nikola Jovanović, Jovan Ristić, and Aksentije Marković also worked in this department. In 1858, Nevole left the civil service due to dynastic changes and began working in Belgrade as a private builder.

Jan Nevole may not be the earliest modern architect to have ever worked in Serbia, but in retrospect, it was the Serbian government that invited him and others "to conduct reforms, used for the university to mark the beginning of national rebirth". Combining German Rundbogen and Serbo-Byzantine Revival styles, such as Captain Miša's Mansion, a private residence of monumental scale, completed in 1863, became the first major work of that movement. At the time, it was the largest and most beautiful palace in Serbia. Although 21st-century taste may differ, it was nonetheless authentic in both form and detail and, considered in the context of its own time, a spectacular achievement. During his time in Serbia from 1845 until 1863, Nevole designed many buildings, the vast majority there.

In 1862, architect František Šebek, Nevole's brother-in-law and the owner of a large estate in Svobodné Hamry, died and left Nevole's wife the farm. Nevole retired and moved into the inheritance there the following year, and they became farmers for the rest of their lives. They also owned the Dřevíkov farm.

Throughout his life, Nevole was active in patriotic circles wherever he went and worked. In Prague, he met other revivalists and supported the emerging Czech literature; Josef Kajetán Tyl dedicated a short story – "Rozin Ruthardov" – to him about the ancient builder. In Belgrade, Nevole's house was the center of the local Czech community in Serbia. There he befriended Serbian General František Zach, who then, after retiring due to disability, lived with the Nevole household in Bohemia for several years. Nevole also gained the respect of citizens with his patriotic deeds in Kamenice in Old Serbia, where he last worked on construction projects.

He died of old age on 12 April 1903, in Svobodné Hamry, Austria-Hungary.

== Oeuvre ==
There is no precise data on all the buildings in the construction of which Novele participated, but they were certainly numerous. Among them are:

- Military hospital at Njegoševa 15 in Belgrade, demolished due to the construction of the Third Belgrade Gymnasium,
- The Military Academy in Belgrade, on the corner of streets Kneza Miloŝ and Nemanjina, destroyed on the 6th of April 1941 during Nazi bombing of Belgrade,
- Old spa in Sokobanja,
- Captain Miša's zdanje (bequest) is today a cultural monument of exceptional importance, Miša Anastasijević specifically chose Jan Nevole, educated abroad in the Rundebogenstil, to employ the forms commonly connected with medievalism. Familiarity with such monuments in Vienna, Karlsruhe or Berlin in the hands of European emigrant architects in Belgrade and other major mid-19th-century Serbian architects brought fundamental theoretical change which the style underwent in Serbia in both these two groups that became a distinct Serbian "round-arched style", albeit in the spirit of Serbo-Byzantine Revival.
- Church of St. George in Užice.
- One of the first buildings that Jan Navole designed was the new Military Hospital in Vracar, constructed between 1846 and 1849, intended to accommodate 120 patients.
- The other important state building he designed was the Artillery School, i.e. the Military Academy. The building was built around 1850 on the road to Topcider, in today's Njegoševa Street.

When Nevole left the civil service in 1858 and started working as a private builder (but before leaving Serbia in 1863), he designed his most significant and monumental work: Captain Miša's Mansion. Captain Miša Anastasijević was a private investor, then the richest Serbian trader and shipping magnate. Built from 1858 to 1863, it was the largest and most opulent palace in Serbia. It was intended for the court of an untried ruling couple: the daughter of Anastasijević, Sara and Ðorđe Karadordević (1827–1889). Ambitious plans for marriage were ruined by the return of Prince Miloš Obrenović to power, so Anastasijević bequeathed the building to the "fatherland" for the accommodation of various cultural and educational institutions.

The architecture of the building is a stylistic mixture of Gothic, Romanesque Revival architecture, and Renaissance elements with decorative facades. On the façade towards the University Park, there are sculptures of Apollo with lyre (right) and Minerva with spear and shield (left). The building was always light in colour with reddish decorations.

== Spa renovation in Serbia ==
The poor condition in the spas and lack of accommodation was significantly improved by the respective collaborative efforts of doctor Emmerich P. Lindenmayer (1806–1883), chief of the Serbian Medical Corps, and the architect Jan Nevola.

== Gallery ==
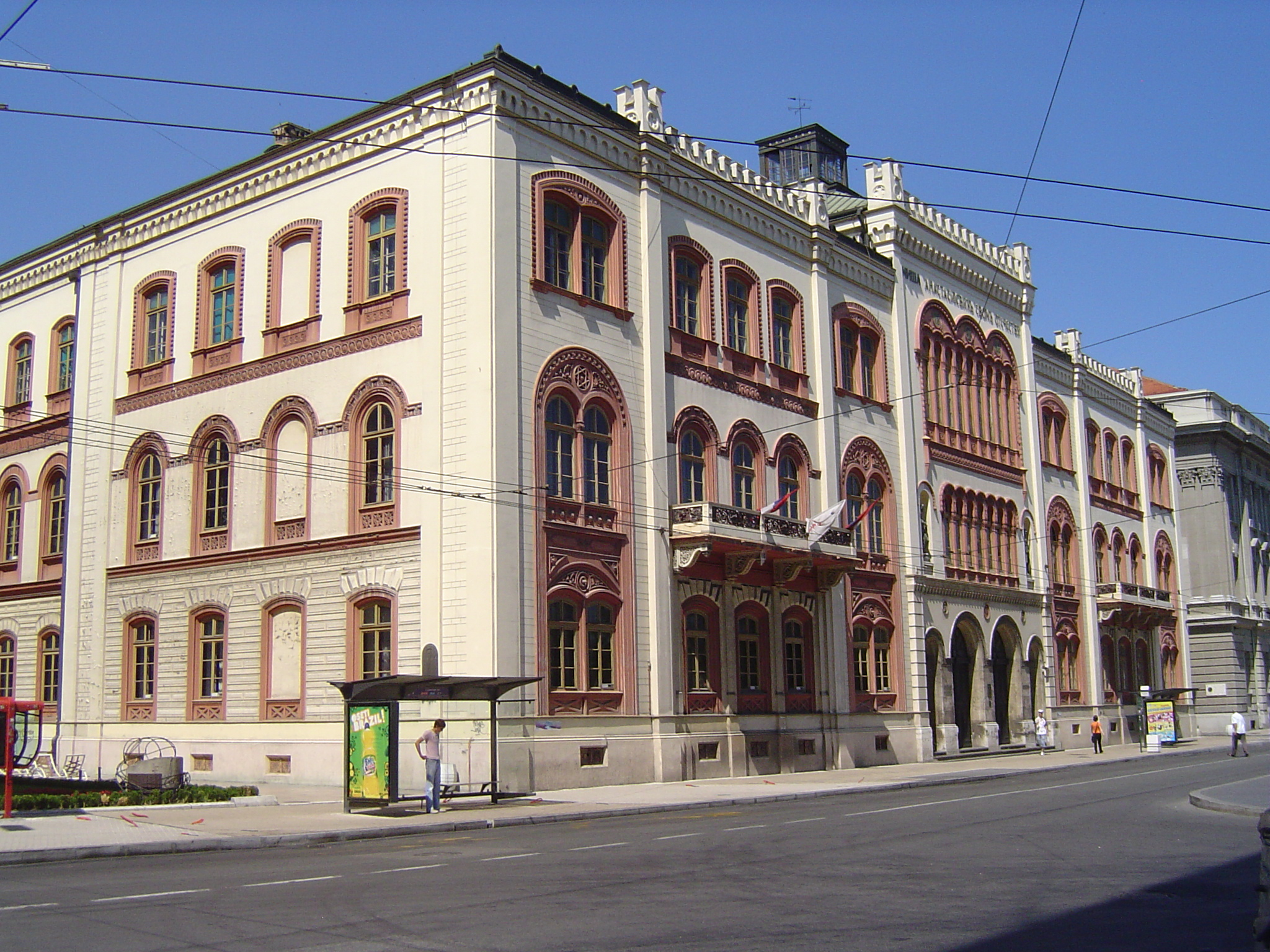
Captain Miša's Mansion

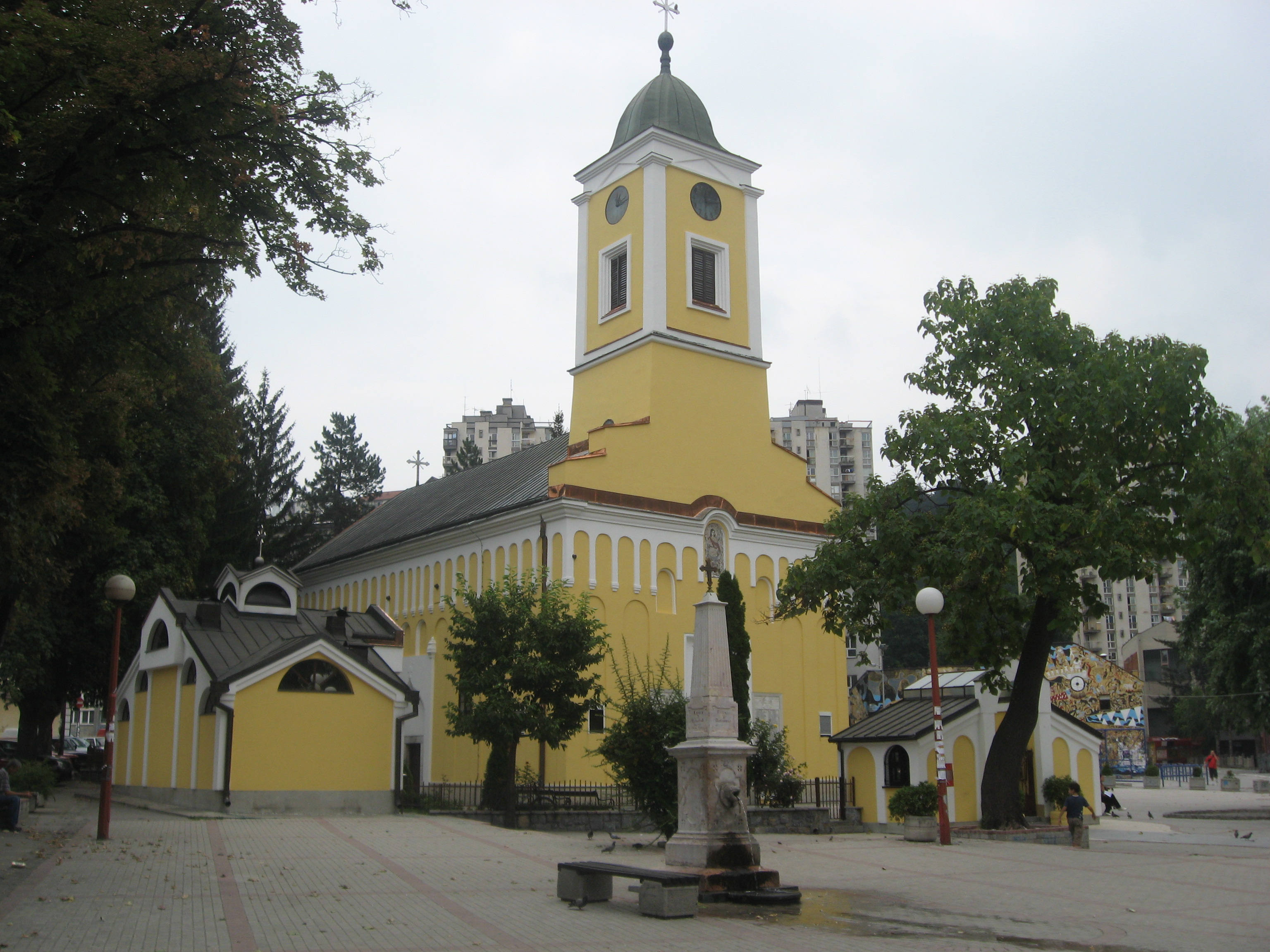
St. George Serbian Orthodox Church, Užice

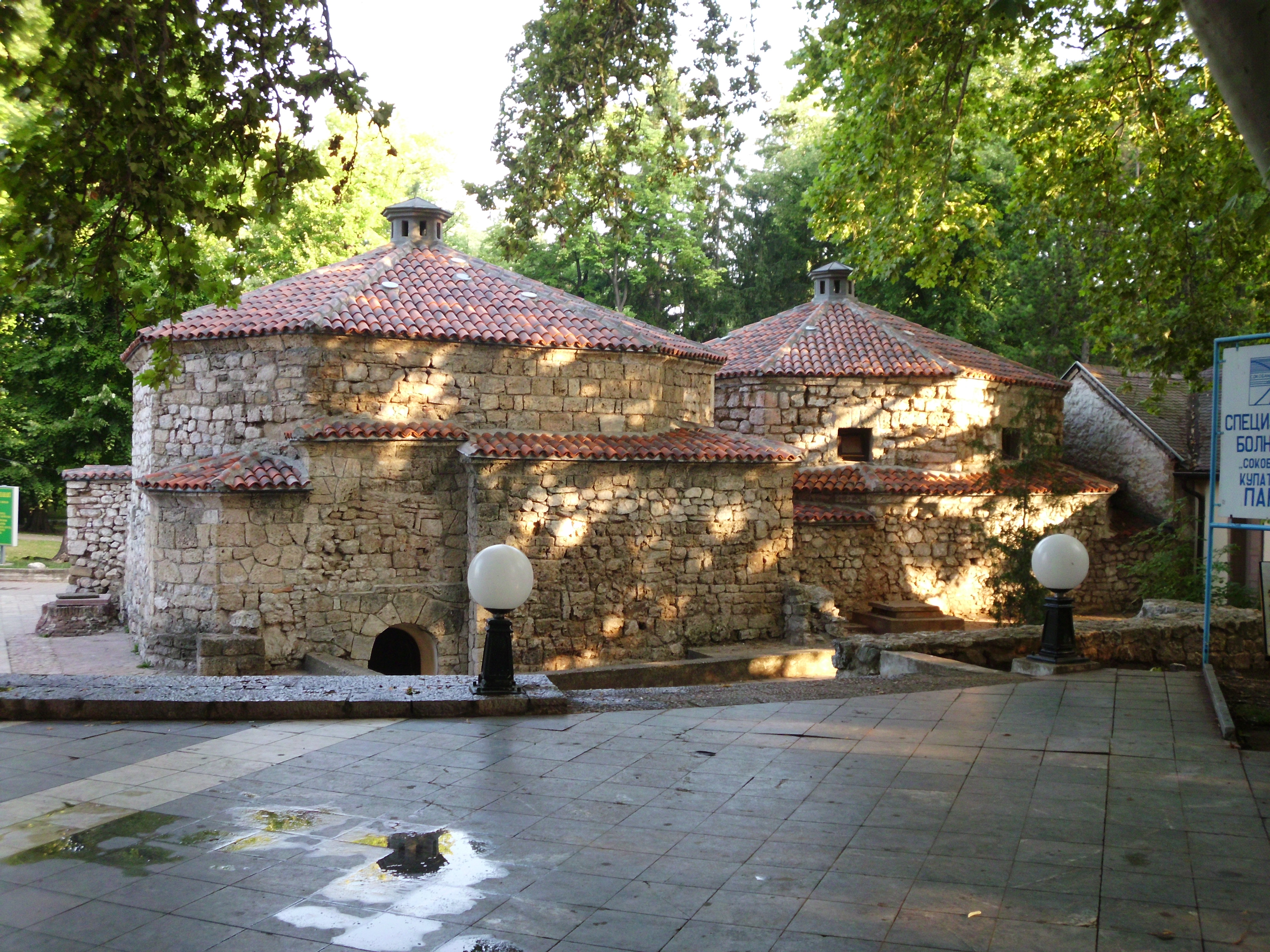
Spas in Sokobanja

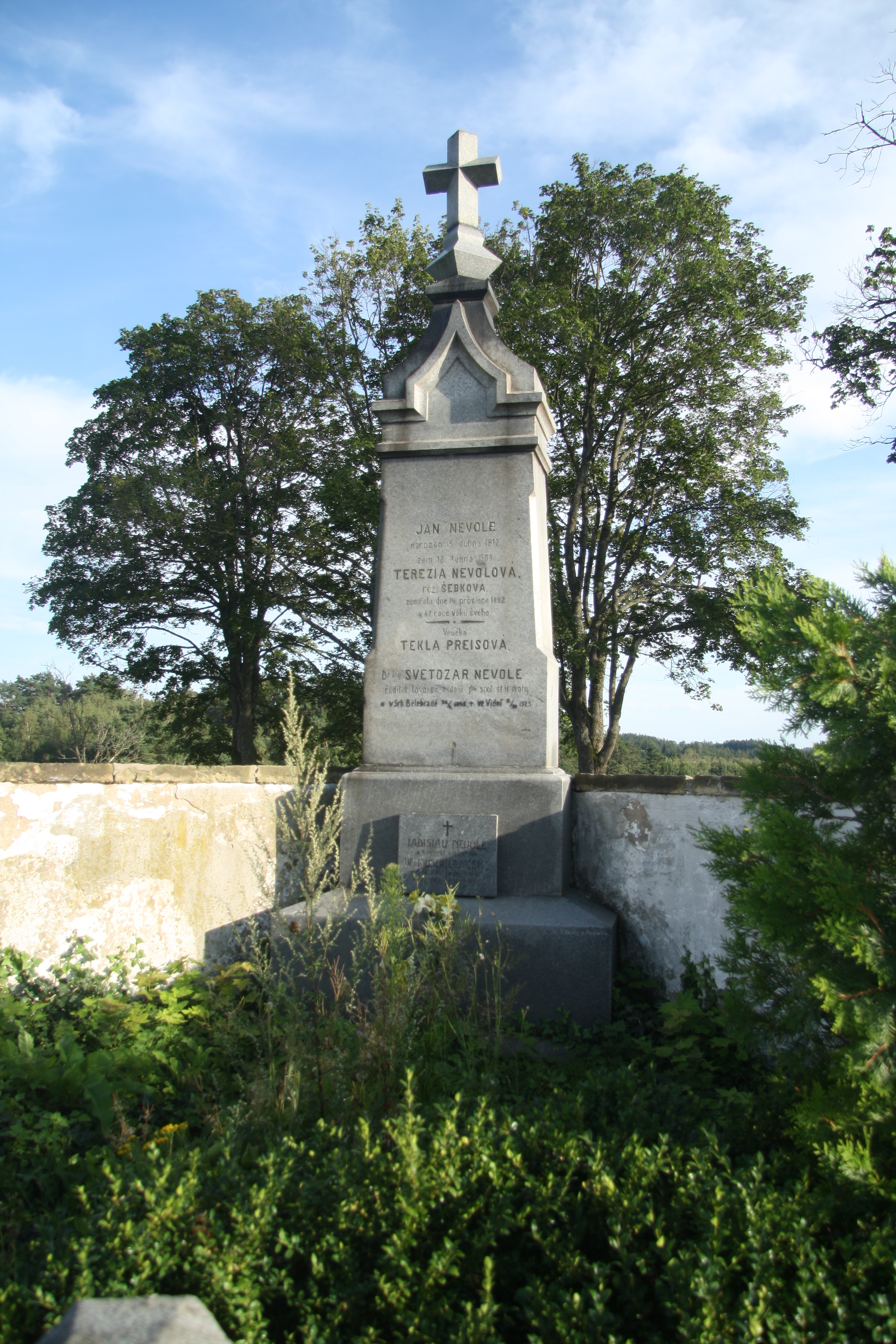
Grave of Jan Nevole

== Kinship ==
Among Jan Nevole's relatives, the following became famous:

- His brother-in-law (brother of his wife) František Šebek (1814–1862), was an architect and politician active in Vienna
- His son Dr. Milan Nevole (1846–1907) was a chemist, sugar expert, businessman and professional writer
- Son-in-law Karel Preis (1846–1916), husband of his daughter Anna, was a professor of chemistry
