= Miša Anastasijević =

19th century Serbian businessman

Miša Anastasijević Миша Анастасијевић
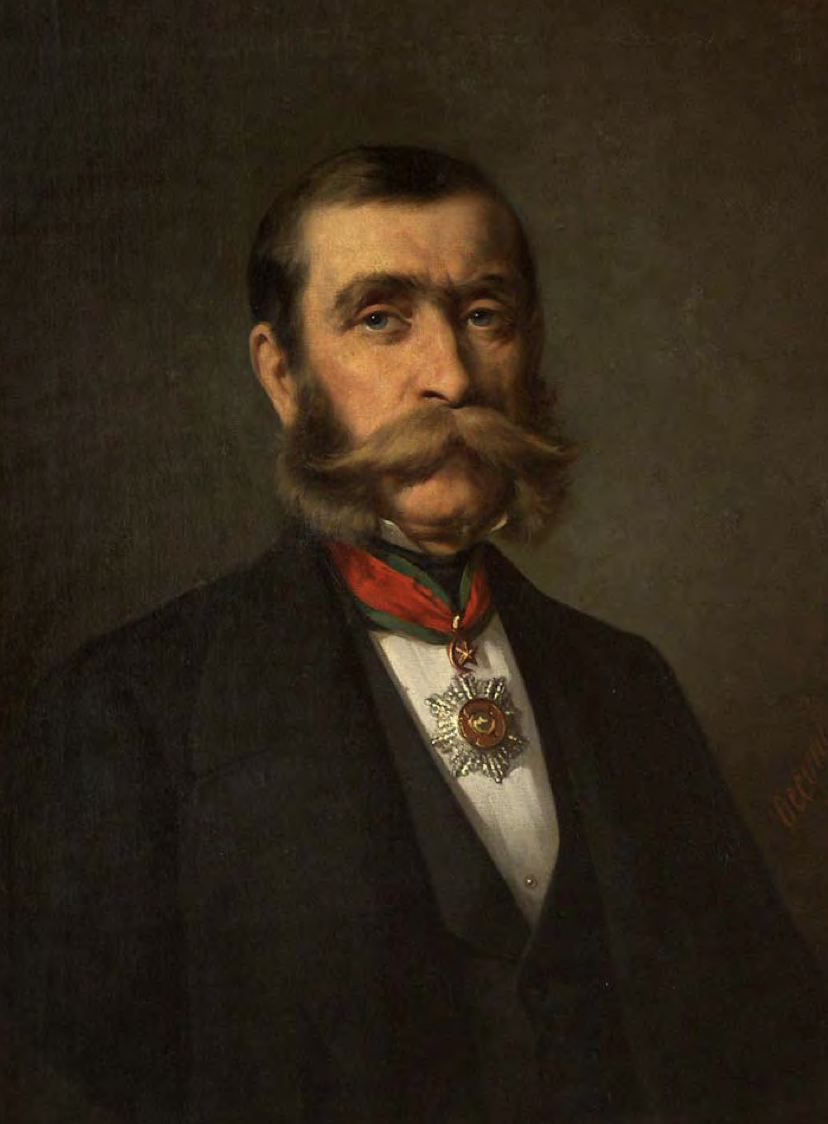
- Portrait of Anastasijević in the National Museum of Serbia

1st President of the National Assembly of Serbia
- In office 30 November 1858 – 31 January 1859
- Monarchs: Aleksandar Karađorđević; Miloš Obrenović I
- Preceded by: Position established
- Succeeded by: Živko Karabiberović

Personal details
- Born: Mihailo Anastasijević; February 24, 1803 Poreč, Pashaluk of Belgrade, Ottoman Empire
- Died: January 27, 1885 (aged 81) Bucharest, Kingdom of Romania
- Resting place: Clejani
- Spouse: Hristina Urošević
- Children: Sara (or Sarka); Ružica; Jelena; Anka; Persida
- Parent(s): Anastas; Ruža
- Known for: 2nd richest person in Serbia; Captain Miša's Mansion
- Awards: Order of the Medjidie
- Military career
- Relatives: Miloš Obrenović I, Prince of Serbia
- Rank: Captain
- Commands: Danube

Mihailo "Miša" Anastasijević (Serbian Cyrillic: Миша Анастасијевић; February 24, 1803 – January 27, 1885) was a businessman and the second richest man in Serbia in the 19th century, through his successful salt export from Wallachia and Moldavia and business partnership with Miloš Obrenović I, Prince of Serbia. He was also the Captain of Danube, and acquired significant benefits from Prince Miloš. Anastasijević was the first public benefactor in Serbia and organizer of various balls for the Belgrade bourgeoisie. He was also a philanthropist.

== Biography ==
=== Early life ===
Anastasijević was born in Poreč, modern Donji Milanovac, Serbia in 1803. His father, Anastas, was a landowner and petty businessman. His mother, Ruža, was a homemaker. His father died when he was only two years old, while his mother died as a result of complications during childbirth, leaving his stepmother Milja in charge of him. Miša and Milja twice crossed the Danube into Austria during the First Serbian Uprising of the Serbian Revolution.

At 11 years old, due to his literacy, he became a teacher in his hometown. From 1817 to 1822, he worked as a charcoal burner (customs officer and supervisor) before going into trade.

=== Career ===
He was a business partner of Miloš Obrenović I, Prince of Serbia, notably the richest. He was given the title of "Danube Captain" by Prince Miloš, from whom he also acquired significant commercial benefits. His company soon gained control over salt exports from Wallachia and Moldavia. At the top of his career, Miša Anastasijević employed circa 10,000 workers and had a fleet of 80 ships. He was the first public benefactor in Serbia and organizer of various balls for the Belgrade bourgeoisie.

Anastasijević was called the “Prince of Danube” or “Danube Rothschild” for his wealth and business skills. Miša Anastasijević married his daughter Sara (Sarka) to George, a Prince from the ruling Karađorđević family and built the most impressive building in the city (Captain Miša's Mansion), which was supposed to be the new court, although this plan failed. The building has hosted some of the most important educational and cultural institutions of the Principality of Serbia including the Belgrade Higher School, which became the University of Belgrade. Occasionally, its gala hall has been used for the meetings of the National Assembly (1864–1875) and Senate (1901–1903). Today, it is the seat of the Rectorate of the University of Belgrade.

=== Private life ===
He was married to Hristina Urošević, the daughter of Ilija Urošević, a priest from Berzasca. They had five daughters:

- Ružica Anastasijević, married to Count Petar Čarnojević, served as Prefect of Temes County and Royal Commissioner during the Hungarian Revolution of 1848
- Jelena Anastasijević, married to Vasilije Garašanin, nephew of Ilija Garašanin, Prime Minister of Serbia
- Anka Anastasijević, married to Radovan Raja Damnjanović (1811–1858), the Serbian Minister of Finance and the Minister of Interior
- Persida Anastasijević, married to Jovan Marinović, Prime Minister of Serbia
- Sara Sarka Anastasijević, Miša's favorite daughter, married to Prince George Karadjordjevic (1827–1887). They were parents of Prince Alexis Karageorgevich and Prince Bojidar Karageorgevitch

== Death ==
Anastasijević died on January 27, 1885, at his home in Bucharest, Romania. His body is preserved at a church in Clejani, Romania. According to the Romanian newspaper Evenimentul zilei, it is naturally mummified and preserved in a "remarkable" state.

== Gallery ==
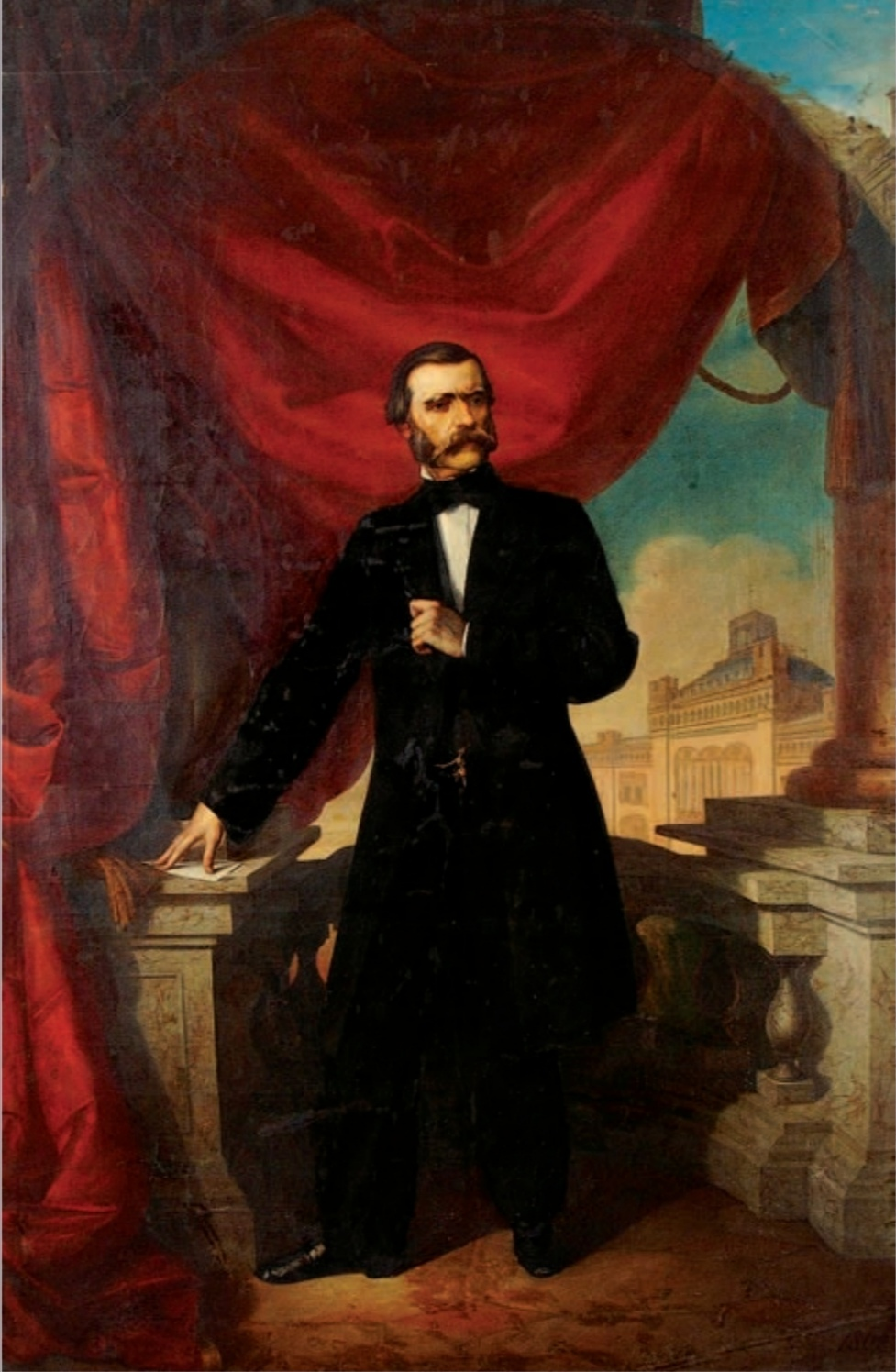
Portrait of Miša Anastasijević, painted by Stevan Todorović—a dignified depiction capturing the stature and character of one of 19th-century Serbia's most prominent merchants and philanthropists. (1866)

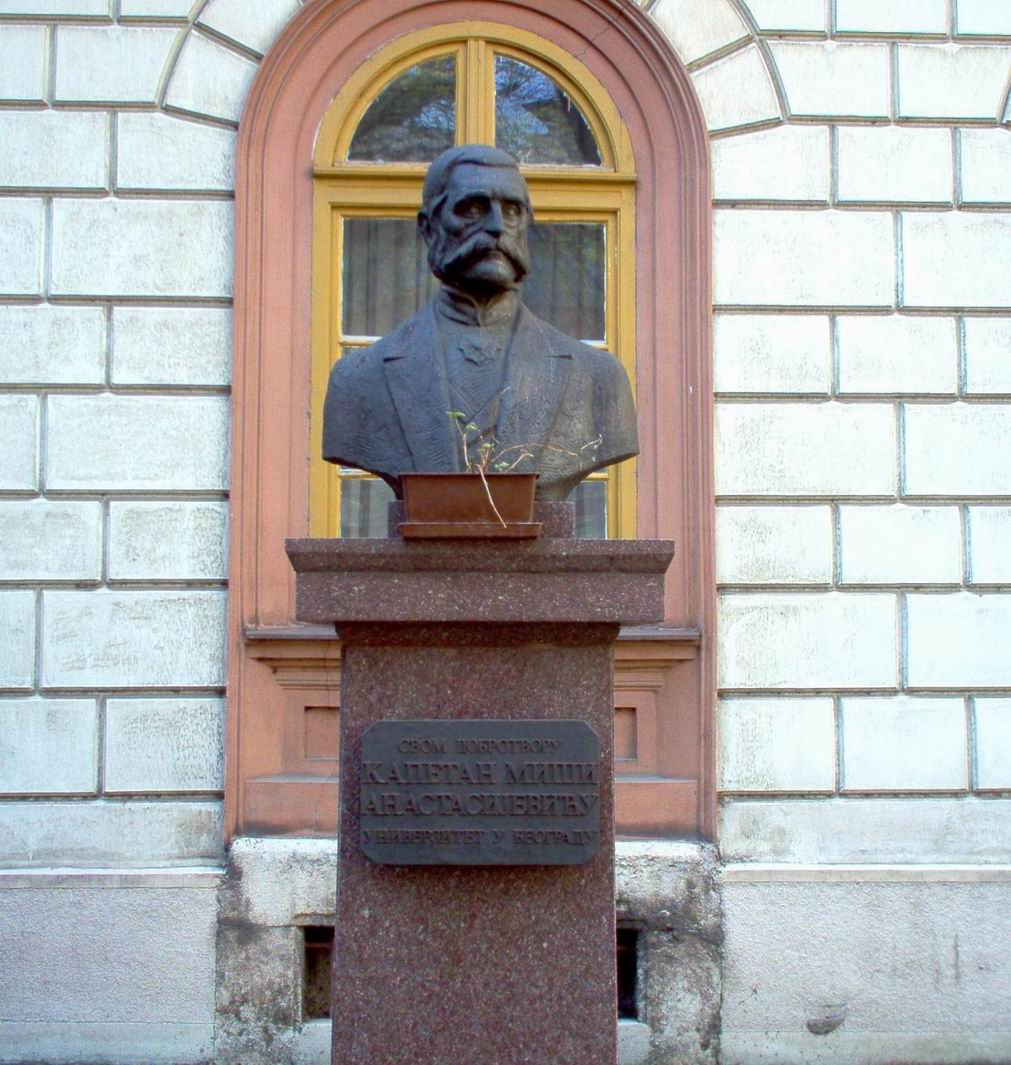
Bust of Miša Anastasijević

== Orders and decorations ==
- Serbia: Order of the Cross of Takovo, 2nd class
- Russia: Order of Saint Stanislaus
- Ottoman Empire:
  - Order of Glory
  - Order of the Medjidie
- Austria-Hungary: Order of Franz Joseph
- Romania: Order of the Star of Romania
- Principality of Waldeck and Pyrmont: Order of Merit

== See also ==
- Captain Miša's Mansion
- University of Belgrade
- Luka Ćelović
- Đorđe Vajfert
- Nikola Spasić
- Marija Trandafil
