= Vysočina =

Vysočina, meaning "highlands" in Czech, may refer to places in the Czech Republic:

- Vysočina Region, a region
- Vysočina (Chrudim District), a municipality in the Pardubice Region
- Bohemian-Moravian Highlands or Vysočina, a range of hills and low mountains
- FC Vysočina Jihlava, a football club
