= Uroš Nemanjić =

Uroš Nemanjić may refer to:

- Stefan Uroš I Nemanjić, King of Serbia (1243–1276)
- Stefan Uroš II Nemanjić, King of Serbia (1282–1321)
- Stefan Uroš III Nemanjić, King of Serbia (1321–1331)
- Stefan Uroš IV Nemanjić, King and Emperor of Serbia (1331–1355)
- Stefan Uroš V Nemanjić, King and Emperor of Serbia (1355–1371)
- Simeon Uroš Nemanjić, Lord of Epirus and Thessaly, self-styled Emperor (1356-1370)
- Jovan Uroš Nemanjić, Lord of Thessaly, self-styled Emperor (1370-1373)

== See also ==
- Uroš, a Serbian given name
- Uroš I (disambiguation)
- Uroš II (disambiguation)
- Stefan Uroš (disambiguation)
- Uroš Vukanović (disambiguation)
