= Stefan Uroš =

Stephen Uroš (Serbian: Стефан Урош, Stefan Uroš) is a Serbian royal name, referring to the following members of the Nemanjić dynasty (Serbian Kingdom and Empire):

- King Stefan Uroš I (1243–1276)
- King Stefan Uroš II Milutin (1282–1321)
- King Stefan Uroš III (1321–1331)
- Emperor Stefan Uroš IV Dušan (1331–1355)
- Emperor Stefan Uroš V (1355–1371)
- Stefan Uroš, ruler of Pharsalos (14th century), son of Despot Simeon Uroš

== See also ==
- Uroš, a Serbian given name
- Uroš I (disambiguation)
- Uroš II (disambiguation)
- Uroš Nemanjić (disambiguation)
- Uroš Vukanović (disambiguation)
- Stefan (honorific), an honorific name adopted by the Nemanjić dynasty rulers of Serbia
