= Prince Alexis Karageorgevich =

Serbian royal claimant (1859–1920)

Prince Alexis
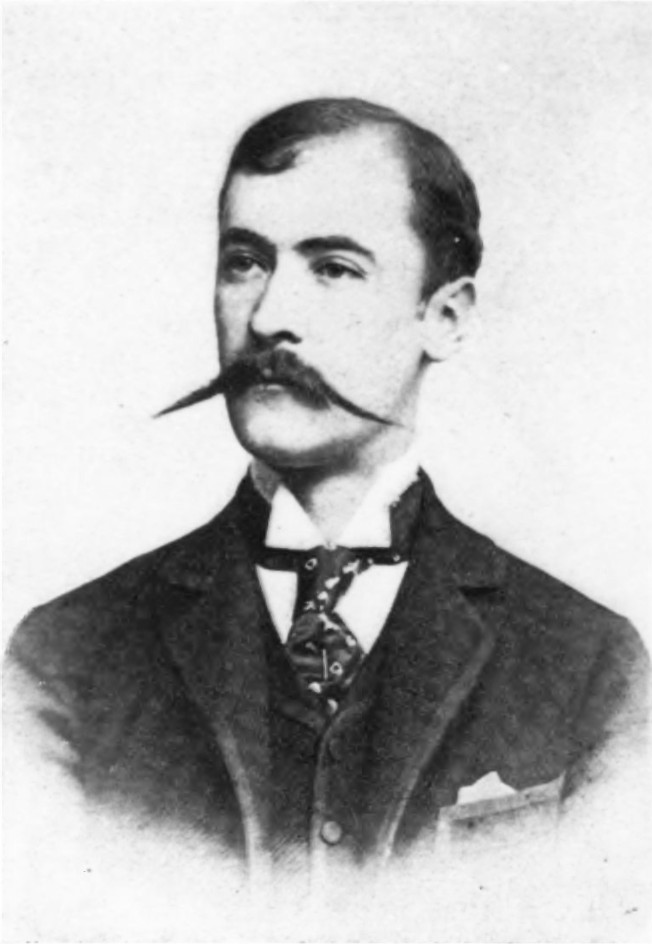
- Born: 10 June 1859; Principality of Serbia
- Died: 15 February 1920 (aged 60); St. Moritz
- Burial: Saint-Georges Cemetery, Geneva
- Spouse: Daria Pratt
- House: Karađorđević
- Father: Prince George Karageorgevitch
- Mother: Sarka Anastasijević

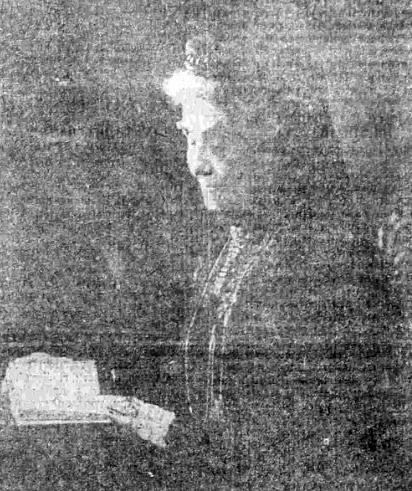
Princess Sara Karadjordjevic, mother of Prince Alexis

Prince Alexis Karageorgevitch, or Karađorđević (Serbian: Алекса Карађорђевић / Aleksa Karađorđević; 10 June 1859 – 15 February 1920), was the head of the senior branch of the House of Karageorgevitch and a claimant to the throne of the Kingdom of Serbia. He served in the First Balkan War of 1912 as a soldier and after as president of the Red Cross until Serbian army's retreat through Albania (World War I).

== Early life and family ==
Prince Alexis was born five months after his great uncle Alexander Karageorgevitch had been forced to abdicate as prince of Serbia. His parents were Prince George Karageorgevitch (1827–1884) and Sarka (or Sara) Anastasijević (died 1931), daughter of Miša Anastasijević‚ President of the National Assembly of Serbia and one of the richest people in Serbia. His younger brother was Prince Bojidar Karageorgevitch. Prince Alexis' paternal grandfather and namesake, Prince Alexis Karageorgevitch (1801–1830) was the eldest son of Karađorđe Petrović and the older brother of Alexander Karageorgevitch.

Prince Alexis grew up living in exile in Paris. He is considered to be the only one of her lovers that artist and courtesan Laure Hayman actually loved.

== Serbian claimant ==
With the death of his father in 1884 Prince Alexis became head of the senior branch of the House of Karageorgevitch and a claimant to the Serbian throne. He was not the only Karageorgevitch to claim the throne as Prince Peter the son of Prince Alexander Karageorgvitch also advanced a claim. In 1895 Prince Alexis said "Not only do I intend not to abandon my legitimate rights, but I am ready to make them prevail." A couple of years later his brother Prince Bojidar made a secret visit to Serbia to gather support for the House of Karageorgevitch.

In late 1898 Prince Alexis met Mabelle Swift, niece of American businessman Gustavus Franklin Swift, in Paris. Prince Alexis proposed marriage with Swift agreeing on condition that her parents consented to the match. In June 1899 Prince Alexis set off for America to seek the approval of her father E.C. Swift. After spending time with her family at their villa in Beverly, Chicago they refused to give their consent to the marriage. One of the reasons speculated on was that her family were concerned that their daughter would merely be a morganatic wife in the event Prince Alexis ascended the Serbian throne.

In January 1902 there was reports in Serbia that King Alexander I from the rival House of Obrenovic was prepared to abdicate in favour of Prince Alexis or at the least he would be named Alexander's heir. However, nothing came of this because the following year King Alexander was assassinated. With the throne now vacant Prince Alexis was overlooked in favour of the head of the younger branch of the family, Prince Peter Karageorgevitch who was elected King Peter I of Serbia. As a result, Prince Alexis announced in an interview that he had abandoned his claim to the throne and by that betraying the wishes of his ambitious mother.

== Later years and marriage ==
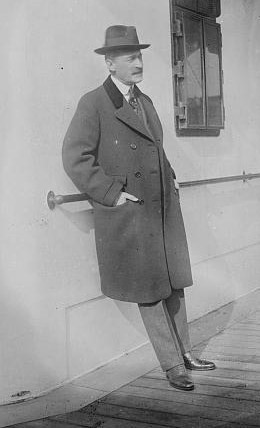
Photo of Prince Alexis Karageorgevitch, claimant to the Serbian throne

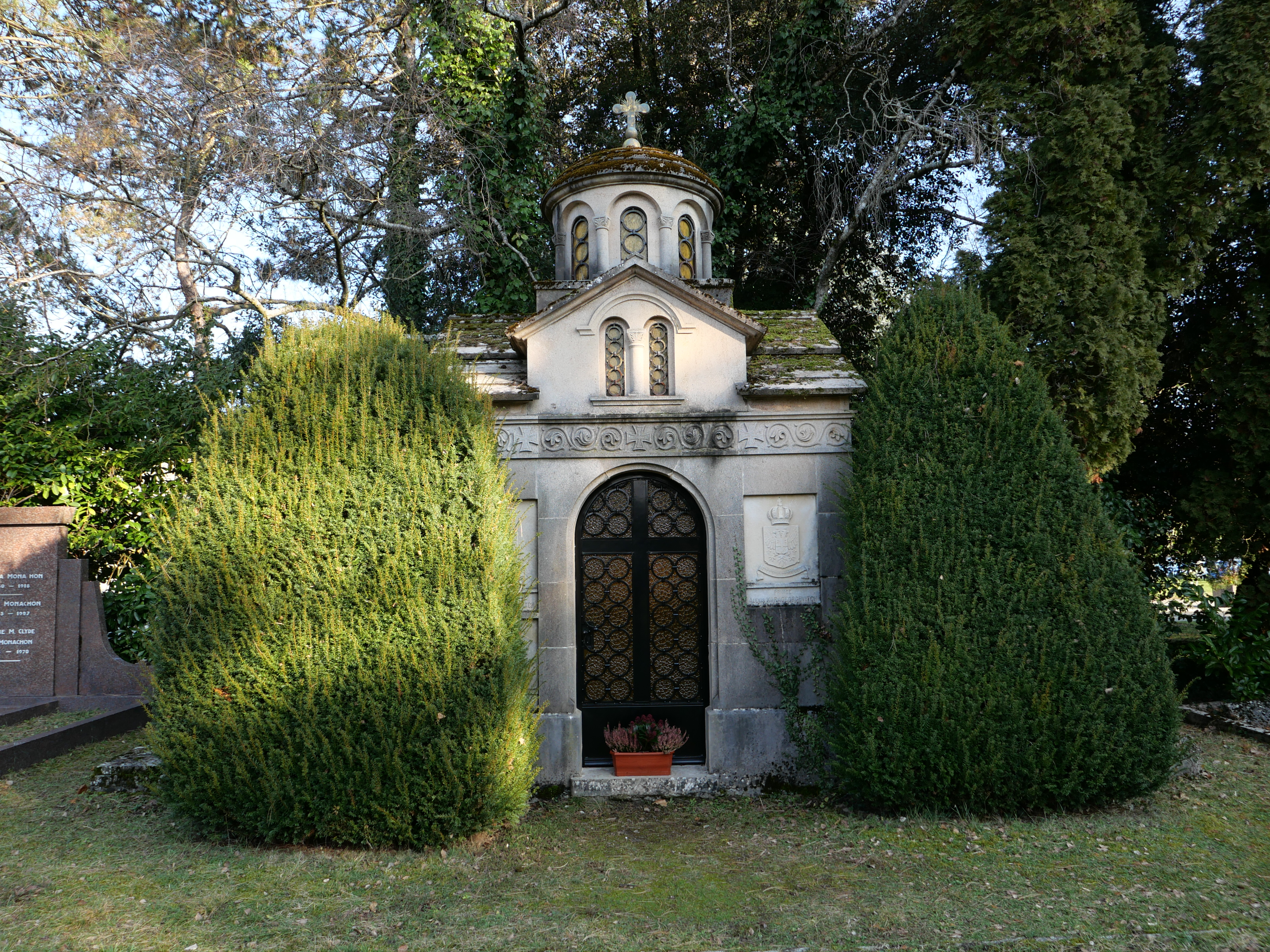
The mausoleum of the Serbian prince Alexis Karageorgevitch (1859-1920) at the cemetery of Saint George in Geneva, Switzerland

With the Karageorgevitch family back on the throne in 1909 King Peter introduced a new statute for the members of the royal house. However the statute made no mention of the members of the senior non reigning branch of the family. In the reigning junior branch the descendants of King Peter were entitled to the style Royal Highness while those of his younger brother Prince Arsen were entitled to that of Highness. Prince Alexis was also completely excluded from the succession which in the event of the extinction of the male lines of King Peter and Prince Arsen would pass to Princess Helen of Serbia.

Although in 1903 Prince Alexis announced that he was abandoning his claim to the throne he remained in Paris even after his cousin had ascended the throne, and in later years he would still claim that he should be king of Serbia saying in 1913 "I have no criticism to make of King Peter, except that I ought to be King of Serbia, as I am an eldest son."

It was not until the outbreak of the First Balkan War that Prince Alexis came to Serbia. Determined to serve he received King Peter's permission and trimming his moustache to disguise his features enlisted into the Serbian Army as a private soldier. During the war he took part in the fighting at the Battle of Monastir and the Battle of Kumanovo.

On 11 June 1913, a month after the First Balkan War had come to an end, Prince Alexis returned to Paris and married Myra Abigail Pratt (née Pankhurst; daughter of John Foster Pankhurst and his wife, Maria Louise Coates. His father was vice-president of Globe Iron Works Company and co-owner of American Ship Building Company of Cleveland; divorcée of Herbert Wright in 1900; and widow of Thomas Huger Pratt) in the Russian Church. She was received in the Eastern Orthodox faith under the Slavic name of Daria. The US Ambassador to France Myron Timothy Herrick served as one of the bride's witnesses while Prince Arsen Karageorgevitch and the Comte Ferdinand Baston de la Riboisière served as witnesses for Prince Alexis. As a result, Princess Sara, his mother, who thought the marriage was a mésalliance and was against it from the start, broke all communication with her eldest son. Prince Alexis and his new wife honeymooned in the South of France before heading to his wife's home city of New York. This was his first trip to the U.S. in 14 years.

During the First World War Prince Alexis and his new wife returned to Serbia to support the war effort with Prince Alexis serving as President of the Serbian Red Cross. After the fall of the wartime capital Niš to the Central Powers Prince Alexis and his wife had to take part in the mass retreat from Serbia through the treacherous mountains of Montenegro and Albania in the winter of 1915–1916. The couple arrived in Rome on Christmas Eve 1915. They visited the United Kingdom in summer 1917.

With the death of Prince Alexis in 1920 during the final year of the worldwide Spanish flu pandemic, the male line of the senior branch of the Karageorgevitch dynasty became extinct. The prince died in St. Moritz in Switzerland and his grave can be found in the Saint-Georges cemetery in Geneva.
