= Abbie Pratt =

American golfer (1859–1938)

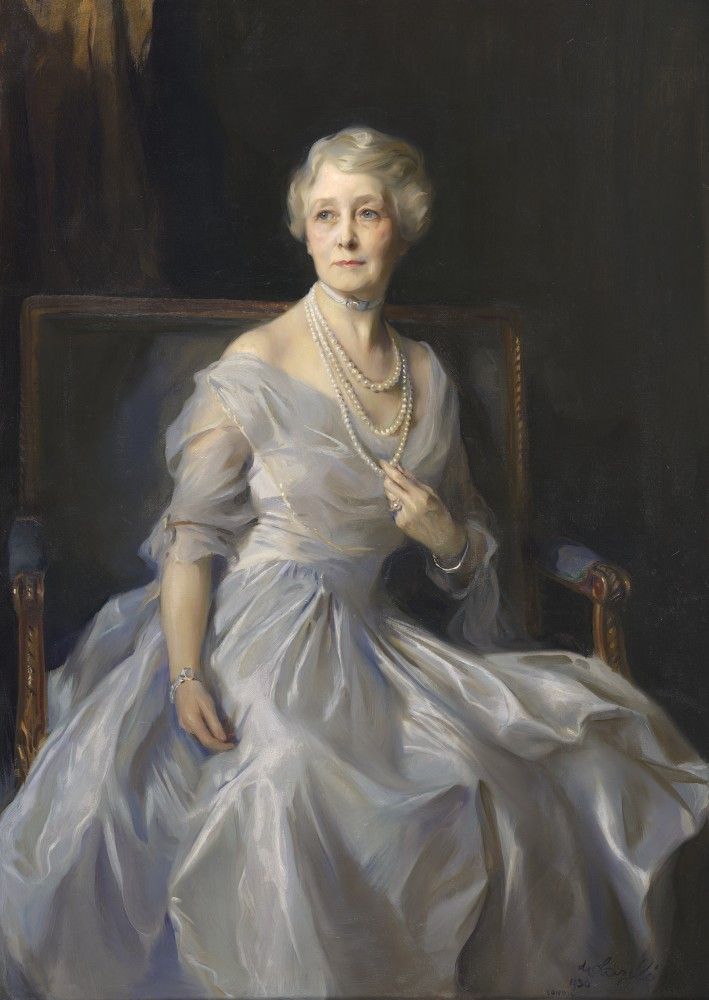
- Princess Daria Karadjordjevic painted by Philip de László

Personal information
- Full name: Myra Abigail Pankhurst
- Nationality: France
- Born: March 21, 1859 Cleveland, Ohio, U.S.
- Died: June 26, 1938 (aged 79) Cannes, France
- Spouse: Prince Alexis Karageorgevich (m. 1913; died 1920)

Career
- Sport: Golf
- Status: Amateur
Medal record
Women's golf
Representing France
Olympic Games
| Bronze medal – third place | 1900 Paris | Individual |

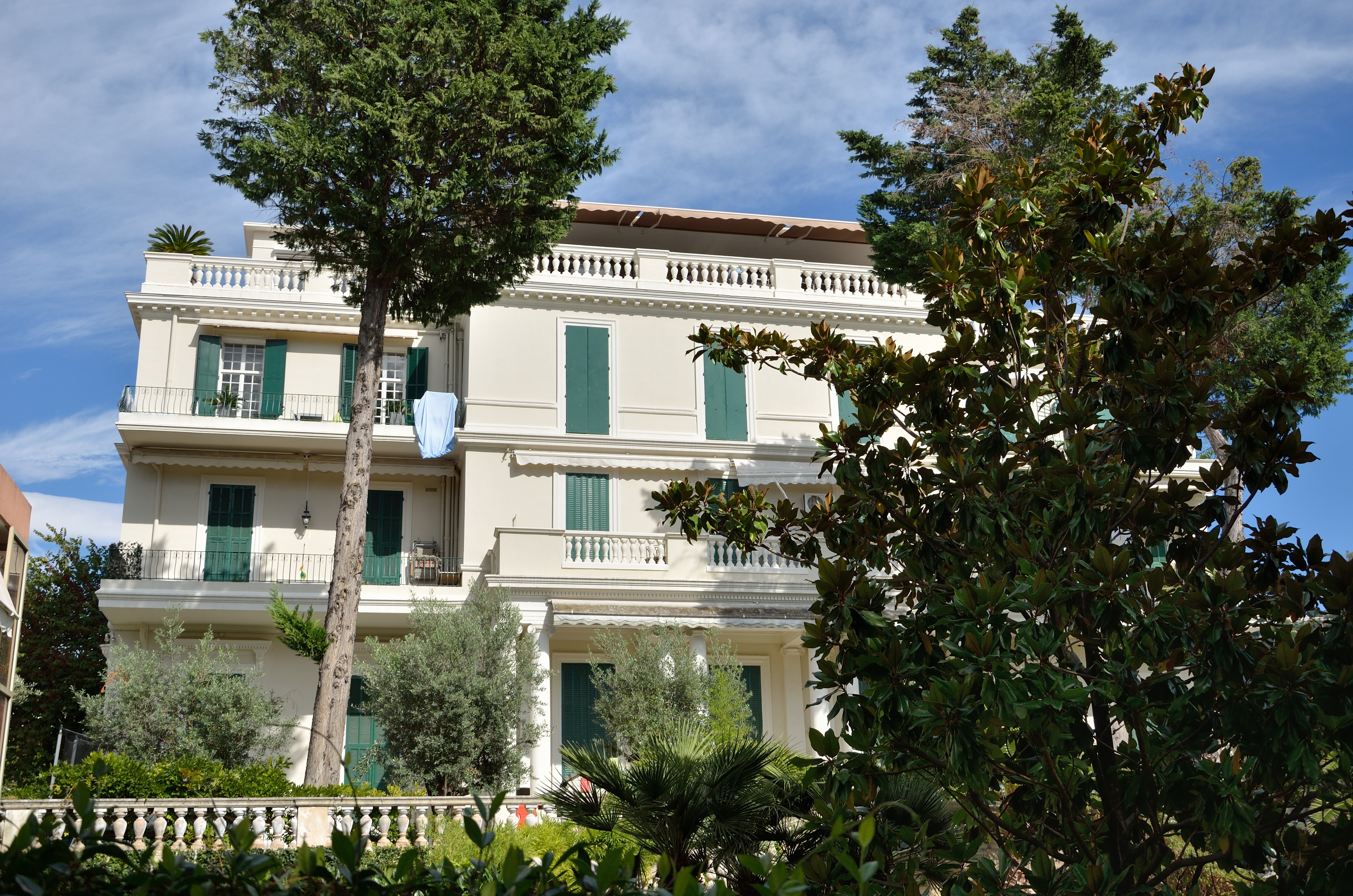
Villa Fiorentina in Cannes served as the French residence of Princess Daria

Myra Abigail Pratt née Pankhurst and formerly Wright, later Daria, Princess Karageorgevich (March 21, 1859 – June 26, 1938) was an American golfer who competed in the 1900 Summer Olympics representing France. She won the bronze medal in the women's competition. By virtue of her third marriage, she was member of the House of Karađorđević.

== Early life ==
Myra Abigail Pankhurst was born on March 21, 1859, to Maria Louise (née Coates) and John Foster Pankhurst, vice-president of Globe Iron Works Company and co-owner of American Ship Building Company of Cleveland.

== Life and golf career ==
Her first husband was Herbert Wright. It is unclear whether Wright died in 1880 or the two were divorced in the 1890s. She later married Thomas Huger Pratt shortly before the 1900 Olympics. The two were frequently in Europe and were members of the Dinard Golf Club in France. Huger Pratt played in the handicap event (which is not recognized as Olympic), not starting in the main men's tournament. Abbie Pratt finished third in the women's competition, with a score of 53 in the 9-hole stroke play tournament. Despite being American, the IOC recognizes her as a representative of France due to her competing for the Dinard Golf Club.

The fate of Abbie Pratt's marriage to Thomas is also unclear. He may have died in 1905, or possibly in 1907. Alternatively, he may have instead gone missing in 1907; there is one newspaper article reporting that Abbie Pratt was seeking a divorce then due to his disappearance. Another article indicates that he died in 1912 while still married to Abbie.

Abbie Pratt married Prince Alexis Karageorgevich, the unsuccessful claimant to the throne of Serbia, on June 11, 1913, in Paris, taking Daria as her royal orthodox name and was thereafter referred to as Her Highness Princess Daria Karageorgevich. She was received in the Eastern Orthodox faith and Myron Timothy Herrick, US Ambassador to France, served as one of her witnesses at the marriage. The couple honeymooned in the South of France before heading to her home city of New York, the Prince's first trip to the U.S. in 14 years.

She had one daughter from her first marriage, Harriet Louise Wright (1871–1946). Harriet married first, by 1901, Count Alexander Mercati (1874–1947), a son of Count Leonardo Mercati (1838–1901) and his wife, Catherine Venizelos (1848–1919). Count Alexander, a boyhood friend of King Constantine I of Greece (for whom he served as Grand marshal of the Court), was one of the original members of the Hellenic Olympic Committee. After their divorce, she married secondly, at Paris on 5 February 1914, Baron Emmerich von Pflügl (1873–1956), son of Freiherr Richard von Pflügl and of Marianne Hengelmüller Edle von Hengervár.

== Later life ==
During the First World War the Prince and Princess Karageorgevich went to Serbia to support the war effort. After the fall of the wartime capital Niš to the Central Powers, the couple became part of the mass retreat from Serbia through the mountains of Montenegro and Albania in the winter of 1915 and arrived in Rome on Christmas Eve 1915.

On 13 February 1920, Prince Alexis died of lung cancer in Badrutt's Palace Hotel in St. Moritz, Switzerland. Princess Daria surviving him and, after his death, began assuming the style Royal Highness, even though, according to the family’s statute, she was entitled only to the style of Highness. She died in Cannes on 26 June 1938.
