= Víska (Havlíčkův Brod District) =

- Municipality
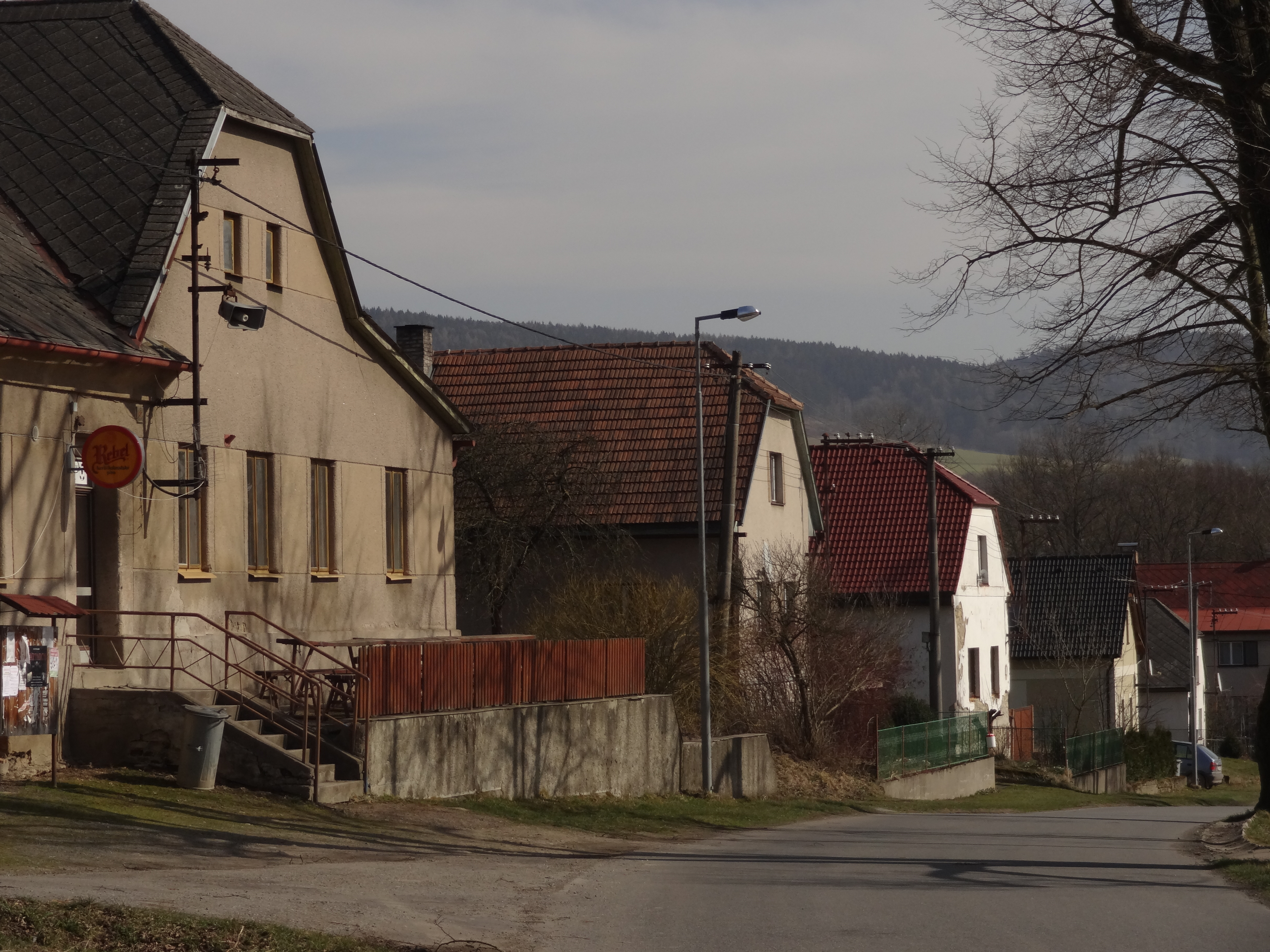
- Upper part of the village

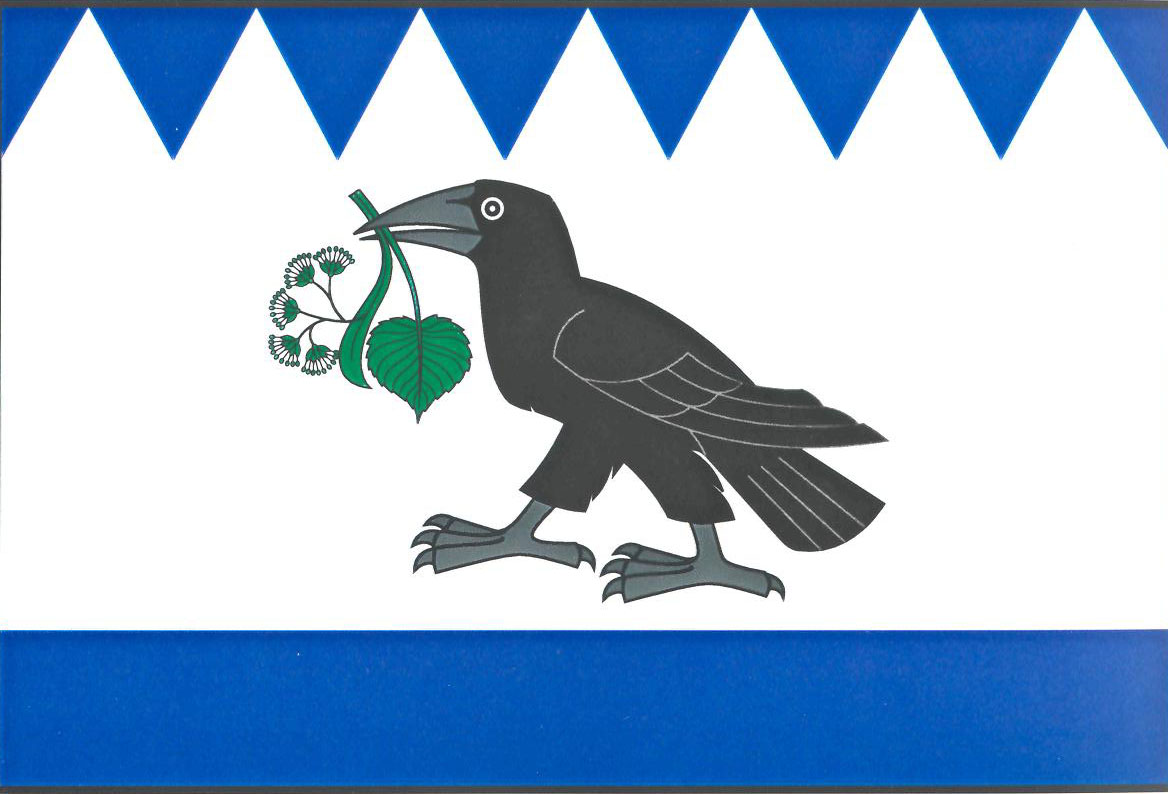
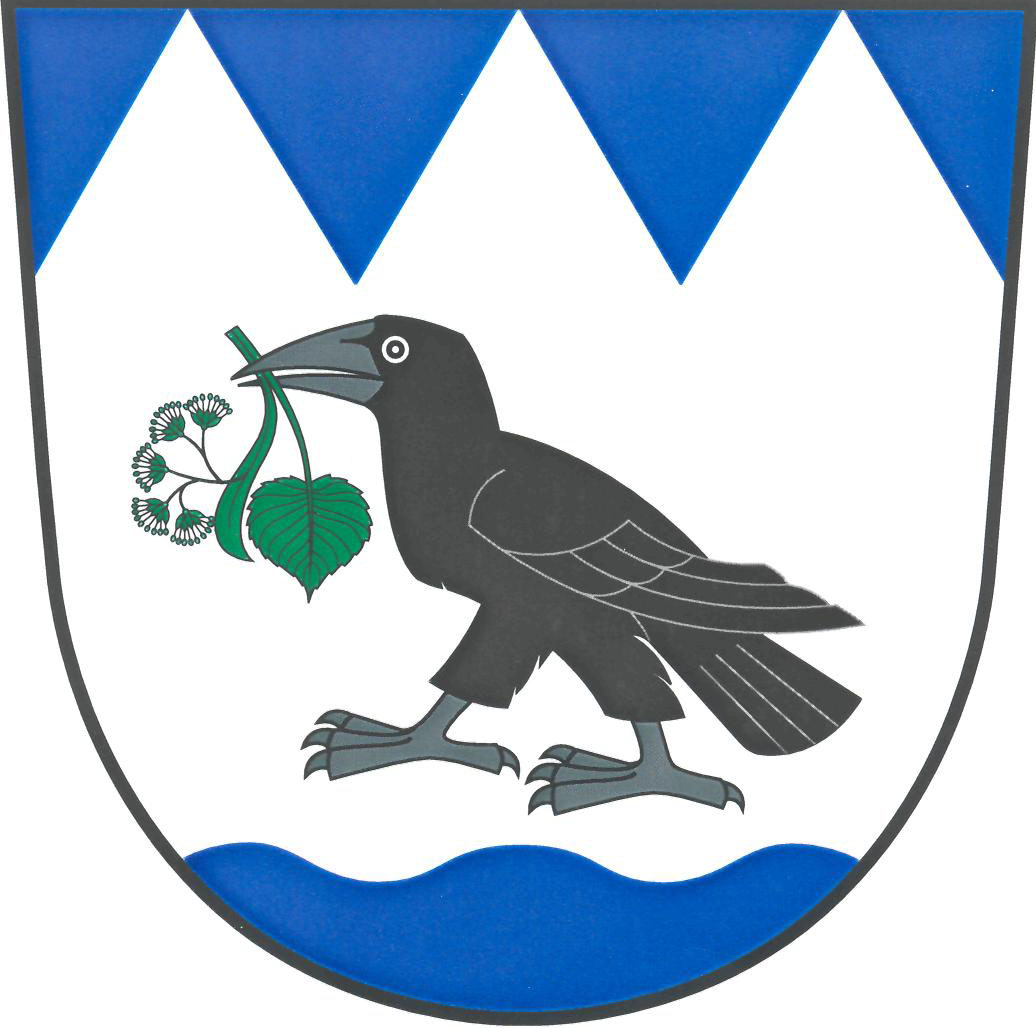
- Flag Coat of arms

- Location in the Czech Republic
- Coordinates: 49°46′13″N 15°39′9″E
- Country: Czech Republic
- Region: Vysočina
- District: Havlíčkův Brod
- First mentioned: 1515

Area
  - Total: 3.86 km^{2} (1.49 sq mi)
- Elevation: 385 m (1,263 ft)

Population (2026-01-01)
  - Total: 187
  - Density: 48.4/km^{2} (125/sq mi)
- Time zone: UTC+1 (CET)
  - Summer (DST): UTC+2 (CEST)
- Postal code: 583 01
- Website: www.obecviska.cz

Víska is a municipality and village in Havlíčkův Brod District in the Vysočina Region of the Czech Republic. It has about 200 inhabitants.

Víska lies approximately 20 kilometres (12 mi) north of Havlíčkův Brod, 42 km (26 mi) north of Jihlava, and 95 km (59 mi) east of Prague.

== Demographics ==
Historical population
| Year | Pop. | ±% |
|---|---|---|
| 1869 | 393 | — |
| 1880 | 415 | +5.6% |
| 1890 | 398 | −4.1% |
| 1900 | 344 | −13.6% |
| 1910 | 400 | +16.3% |
| 1921 | 385 | −3.7% |
| 1930 | 348 | −9.6% |
| 1950 | 270 | −22.4% |
| 1961 | 260 | −3.7% |
| 1970 | 218 | −16.2% |
| 1980 | 182 | −16.5% |
| 1991 | 199 | +9.3% |
| 2001 | 185 | −7.0% |
| 2011 | 169 | −8.6% |
| 2021 | 169 | +0.0% |
Source: Censuses

== Notable people ==
- Jan Nevole (1812–1903), architect
