= Prince Bojidar Karageorgevitch =

Serbian artist and writer (1862–1908)

Prince Bojidar
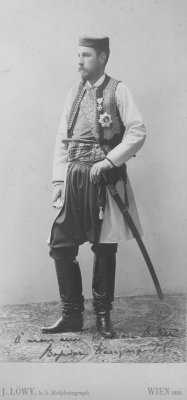
- Born: 11 January 1862; Principality of Serbia
- Died: 2 April 1908 (aged 46); Versailles, French Third Republic
- Burial: Père Lachaise Cemetery
- House: Karađorđević
- Father: Prince George Karađorđević
- Mother: Sara (Sarka) Karađorđević

Prince Bojidar Karageorgevitch (Serbian: Кнез Божидар Карађорђевић / Knez Božidar Karađorđević; 11 January 1862 – 2 April 1908) was a Serbian artist, art writer, world traveller, and member of the Serbian Karađorđević dynasty. He gave singing and drawing lessons and later earned his living as an art critic and translator. He was a contributor to the Encyclopædia Britannica, Le Figaro, La Revue de Paris, Revue des Revues, Magazine of Art, and other publications.

== Life ==
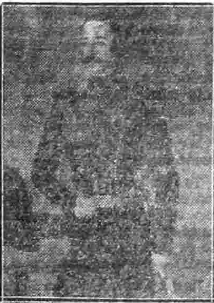
Bojidar's father; Prince George Karadjordjevic (1827-1884)

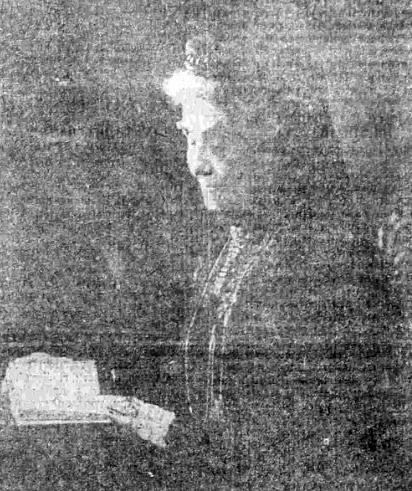
Bojidar's ambitious mother; Princess Sara Sarka Karadjordjevic, the favorite daughter of Miša Anastasijević, President of the National Assembly of Serbia, also known as the Prince of Danube ot the Danube Rothschild

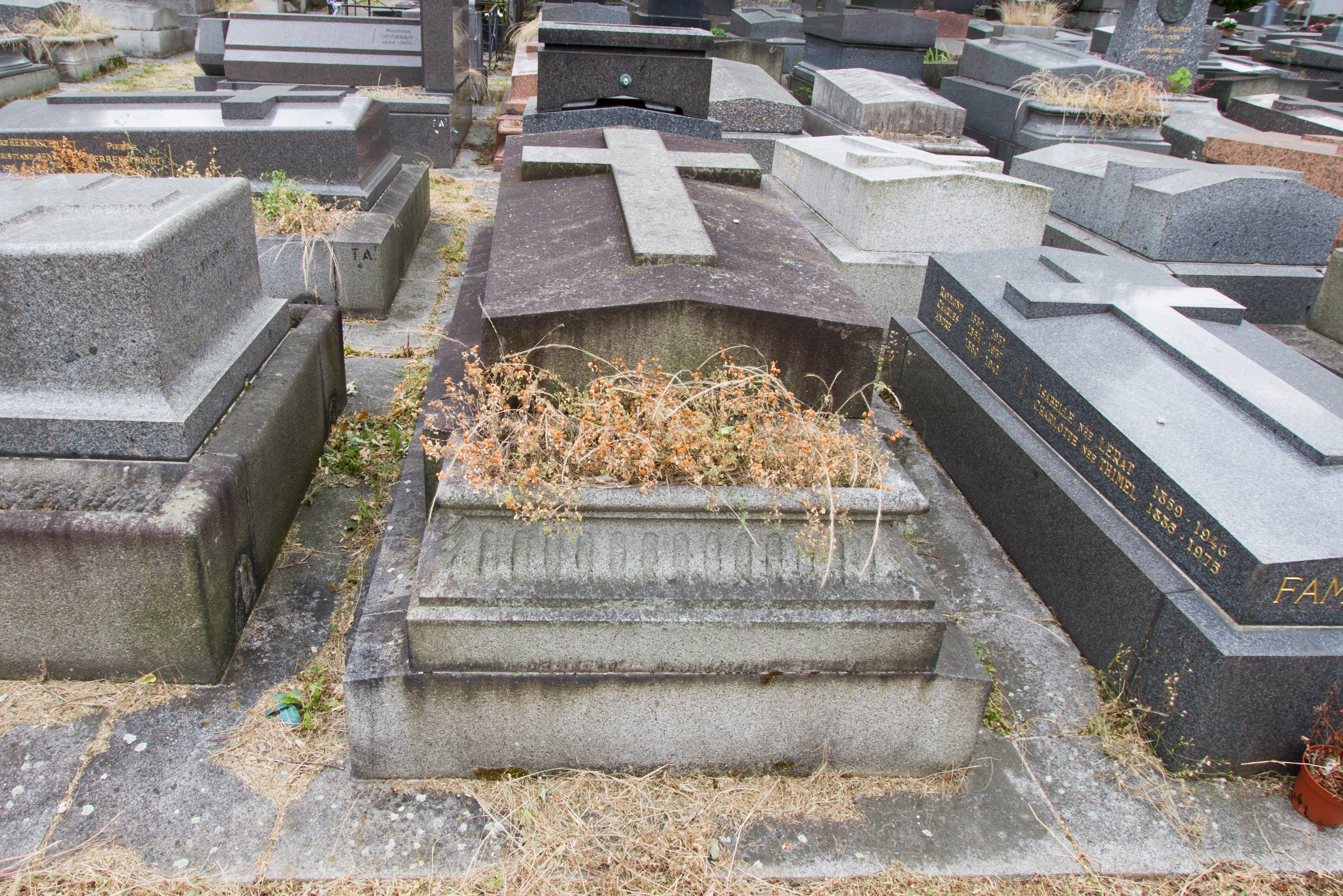
Prince Bojidar's grave at Père Lachaise Cemetery, Paris, France

Prince Bojidar belonged to the senior line of the Karađorđević dynasty (his older brother was Prince Alexis Karađorđević). He was the second son of Prince George Karađorđević (1827–1884) and his wife Sara Anastasijević (1836-1931), daughter of Miša Anastasijević, Serbian Senator and one of the richest people in Serbia. Prince Bojidars' paternal grandparents were Prince Alexis Karageorgevitch (1801–1829), the eldest son of Karađorđe Petrović and his wealthy wife, Maria Nikolaevna Trohin (1806-1827) from Bessarabia, the daughter of Nicolae Konstantinovich Trohin, the Marshal of the Nobility of Khotyn (1828-1831) and his wife, Victoria Konstantinovna Buzny (d. 1824), the daughter of Boyar Konstantin Ilyich Buzny (b. circa 1750), who held the title of Armaș; both of their families belonged to the Nobility of Moldavia and Wallachia. He also had one younger sister (1862-1867), born ten months after him, who died in infancy, but there is no record of her name.

Prince Bojidar lived in France for most of his life as the members of the Karađorđević dynasty were in exile after Prince Alexander Karađorđević lost the Serbian throne in 1858. Bojidar traveled a lot and went on a number of trips around the world. He served in the French Army and fought in the French campaign at Tonking and was decorated with the Cross of the Legion of Honour. To earn a living he gave singing and drawing lessons before becoming a translator and journalist. He visited Serbia twice at the turn of the century (1897 and either late 1899 or early 1900), both times semi-incognito, trying to evaluate the general feel in the population about a possible replacement of the Obrenović dynasty with the Karađorđevićs should King Alexander Obrenović die childless, as was expected to happen at the time, due to the King's marriage with Queen Draga of an age beyond childbirth years at the time. He also visited Serbia once after his second cousin once removed King Peter I Karađorđević was enthroned but became disillusioned with the treatment he received (mostly ignored by his regal relative).

During one of his trips abroad, he traveled extensively around India, visiting thirty-eight cities. He wrote a book about his experiences called Enchanted India in which he offered an account of the Indian people, their religious rites, and other ceremonies. He also provided detailed descriptions of the Indian landscape and buildings. He also translated works of Tolstoy and Hungarian dramatist Mór Jókai.

Taking an interest in art, he visited Munich, Dresden, and Berlin and spent some months in Italy; afterward, he settled in Paris. There he regularly contributed articles to the Figaro, La Revue de Paris, the Magazine of Art (Ilya Repin, Jules Bastien-Lepage), including a biography of Marie Bashkirtseff in the Encyclopædia Britannica, 11th Edition, Vol. III. On November 8, 1889, he attended in Rochefort, France, the orientalist feast given by French writer Pierre Loti who has just returned from his diplomatic mission with Sultan Hassan I of Morocco. His mother later claimed that Loti had ruined him by introducing him to Greek love. Biographer Stevan K. Pavlowitch claims that the Prince was openly gay and had no relationship with women except purely platonic.

In Montmartre, he met and befriended French stage actress Sarah Bernhardt, pioneer of modern dance Loïe Fuller, French poet, novelist and noted orientalist Judith Gautier, Suzanne Meyer-Zundel, Austrian composer Hugo Wolf, painter and illustrator Henri de Toulouse-Lautrec, and founder of the Ballets Russes Sergei Diaghilev. He was especially close to Jules Bastien-Lepage, and was with the ailing painter when he died at the age of 36. "At last he was unable to work anymore," wrote Karageorgevitch, "and he died on the 10th of December, 1884, breathing his last in my arms."

In his later years Prince Karadjordjevitch turned his attention in decoration, and executed panels and medallions for a Paris atelier as a designer, sculptor, painter and silversmith, and often spent time with Georges Lacombe, Émile Bernard, Édouard Vuillard, Paul Sérusier and other members of Les Nabis. Karageorgevitch's paintings, illustrations, watercolors and silversmith works were first exhibited in Belgrade in 1908.

== Death ==
Prince Bozidar died at Versailles on 2 April 1908 from typhoid fever. His body was buried in the Cimetière Père Lachaise, Paris, France.

== Works ==
Media related to Prince Bojidar Karageorgevitch at Wikimedia Commons

- Karageorgevitch, Prince Bojidar (1899). Enchanted India. Harper & Brothers, New York.
