= Uroš Vukanović =

Uroš Vukanović (Serbian Cyrillic: Урош Вукановић) may refer to:

- Uroš I Vukanović, Grand Prince of Serbia (1112–1145)
- Uroš II Vukanović, Grand Prince of Serbia (1145–1162)

== See also ==
- Uroš I (disambiguation)
- Uroš II (disambiguation)
- Stefan Uroš (disambiguation)
- Uroš Nemanjić (disambiguation)
