= Uroš I =

Uroš I may refer to:

- Uroš I, Grand Prince of Serbia, Grand Prince of Serbia (1112-1145)
- Stefan Uroš I, King of Serbia (1243-1276)

== See also ==
- Uroš II (disambiguation)
- Stefan Uroš (disambiguation)
- Uroš Nemanjić (disambiguation)
- Uroš Vukanović (disambiguation)
- Serbia (disambiguation)
