= Captain Miša Mansion =

Building in Belgrade, Serbia

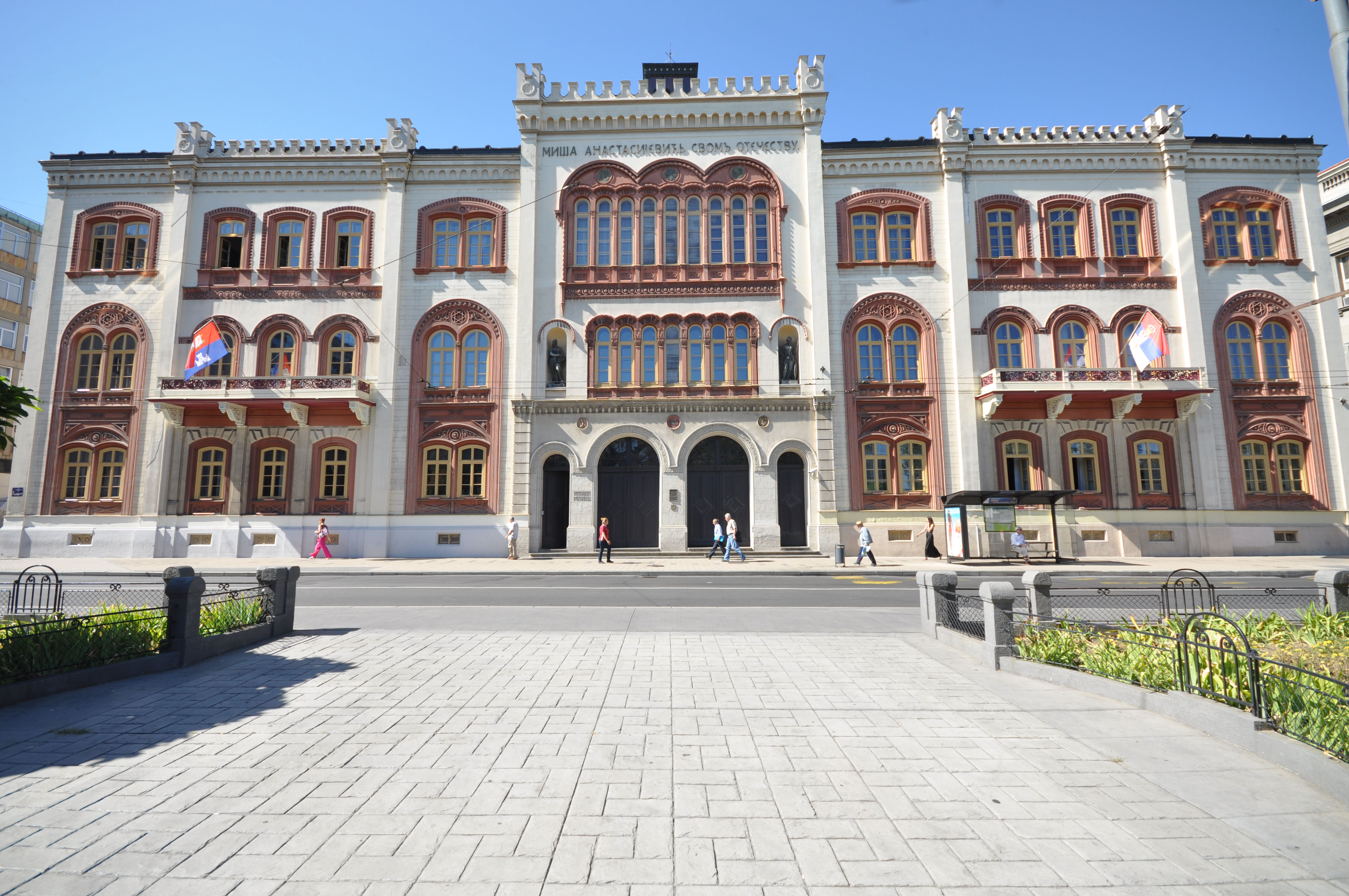
- The Mansion of Captain Miša Anastasijević

- Location within Belgrade

General information
- Location: Belgrade, Serbia
- Coordinates: 44°49′10″N 20°27′26″E
- Completed: 1863; 163 years ago
- Client: Belgrade Higher School

Cultural Heritage of Serbia
- Type: Cultural Monument of Exceptional Importance
- Designated: 4 November 1974
- Reference no.: СК 12

The Mansion of Miša Anastasijević (Serbian: Капетан Мишино здање, romanized: Kapetan Mišino zdanje) is one of the most notable buildings in Belgrade, Serbia. It is the University of Belgrade's administration and governance building.

== History ==
The building was designed by Czech architect Jan Nevole and built in 1863. It had been originally designed to serve for the anticipated court of the grandson of Karađorđe Petrović, who was married to Captain Miša’s youngest daughter Sara. Nevertheless, following the realization of construction, Captain Miša Anastasijevic gave his mansion as a gift to “his mother country for educational purposes”. In September 1863, the Belgrade Higher School was moved into the building. This site is often regarded as one of the most beautiful buildings in Belgrade. Today, the seat of the University of Belgrade is headquartered within its premises.

Initially, the base of the building had a symmetrical regular form, with two distinct parts separated by a vestibule on the ground floor and a ceremonial hall on the second floor. Facade decorations originate from Byzantine, Gothic, and early Renaissance architectural sources. The final cubic shape in the form of a closed block with an inner courtyard most likely dates back from 1905.

Captain Miša Mansion was declared Monument of Culture of Exceptional Importance in 1979, and it is protected by Republic of Serbia.

== Gallery ==
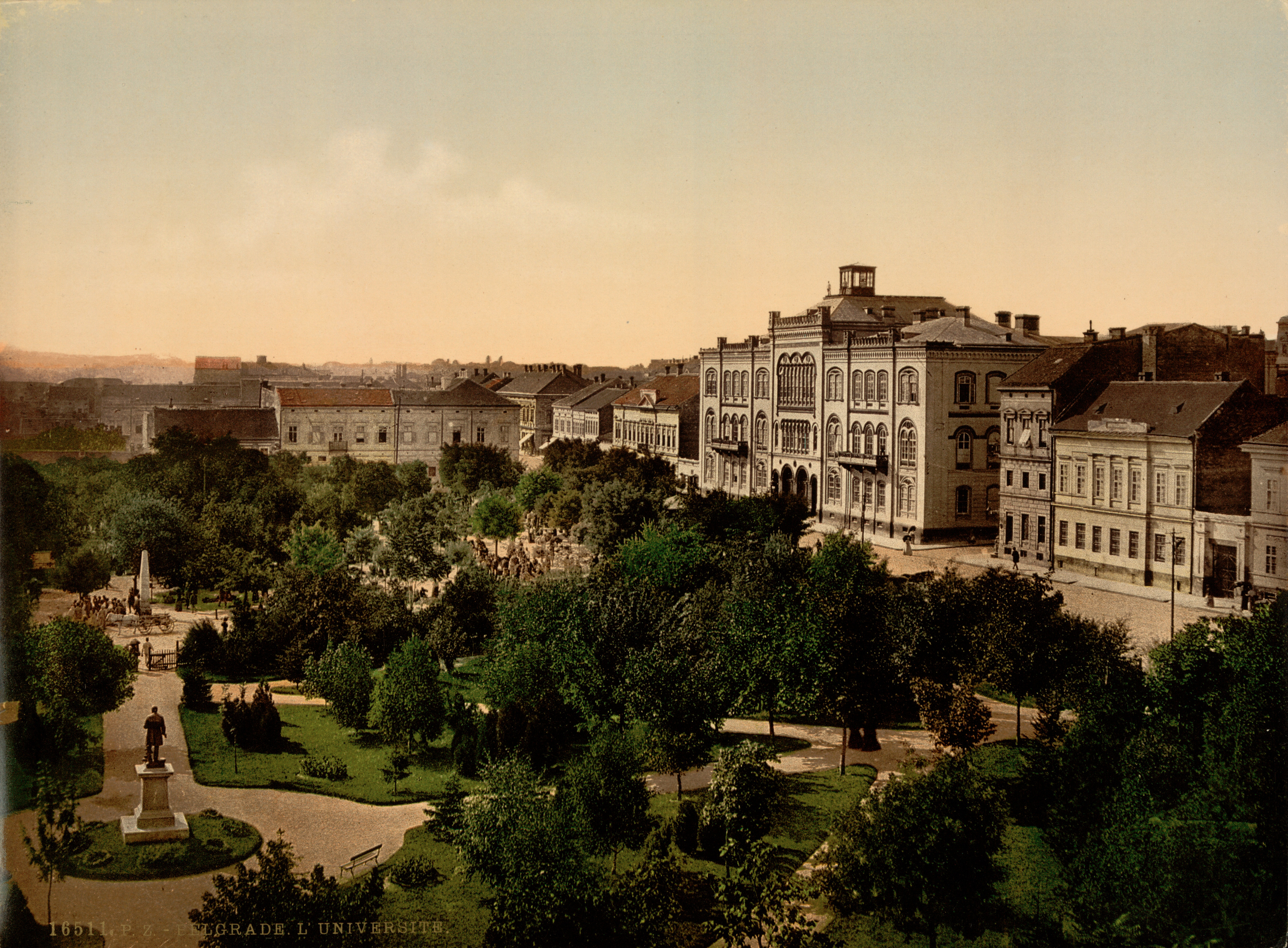
Early 20th century

1913. autochrome

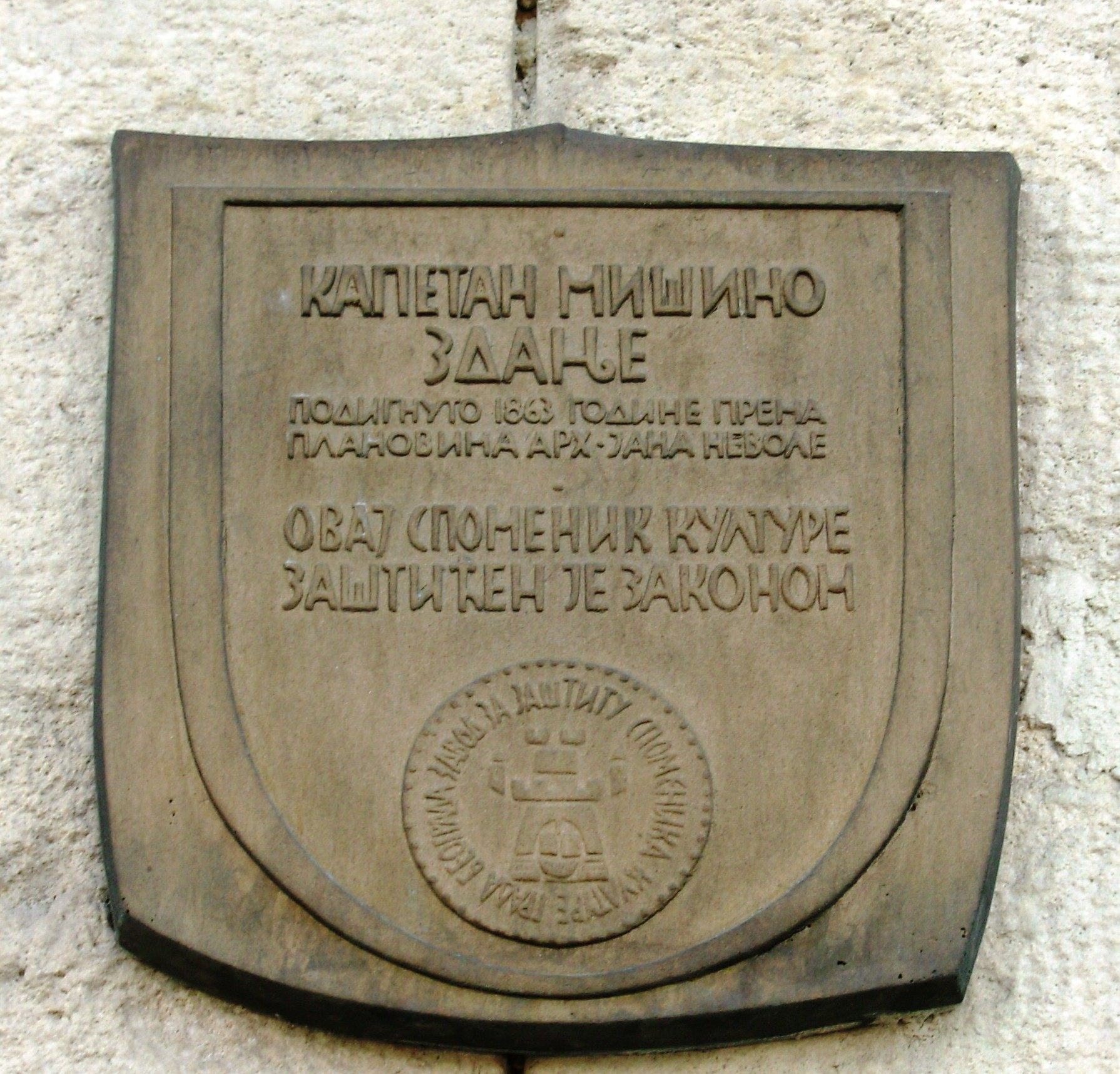
Cultural monument

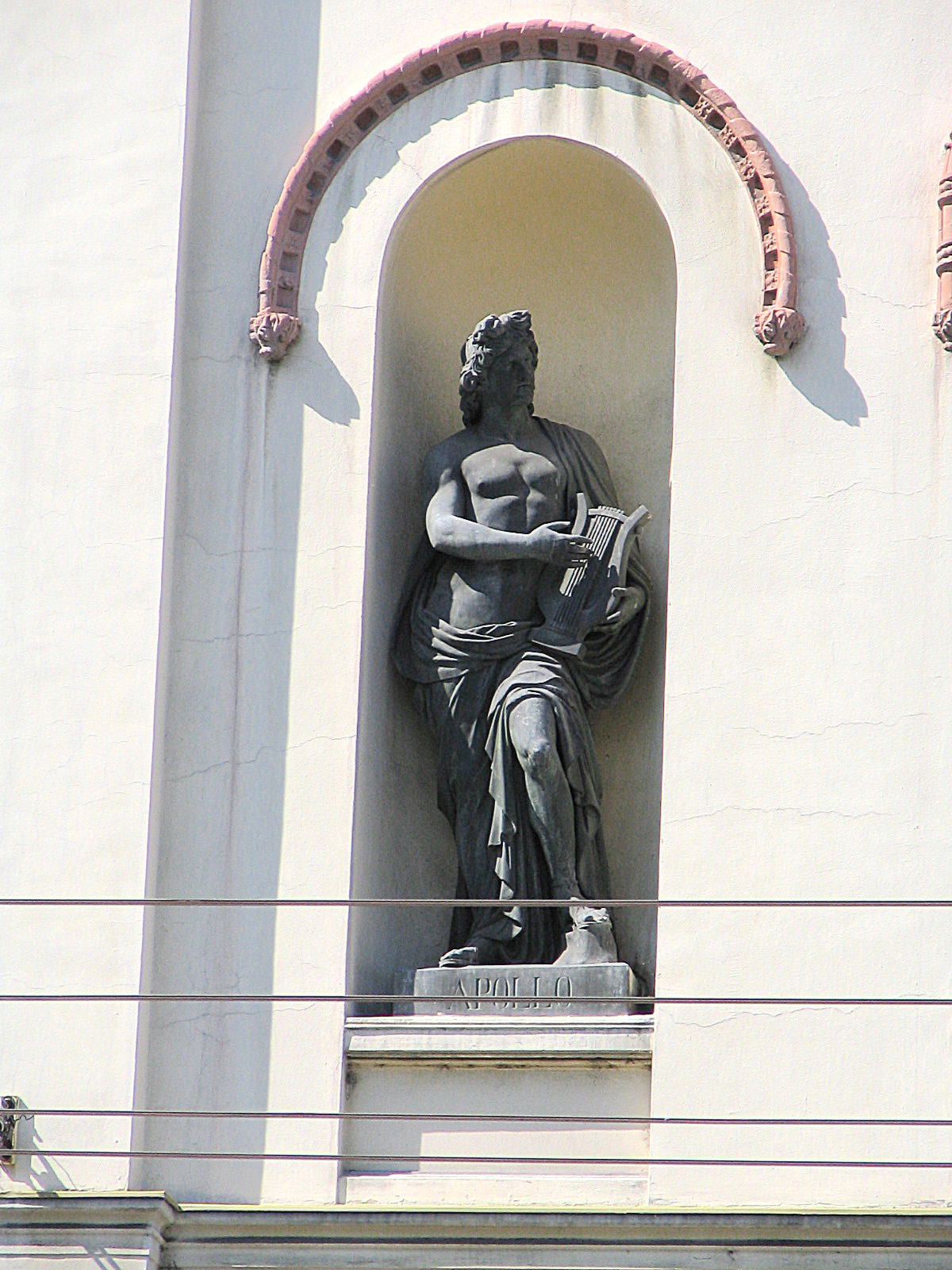
Apollo

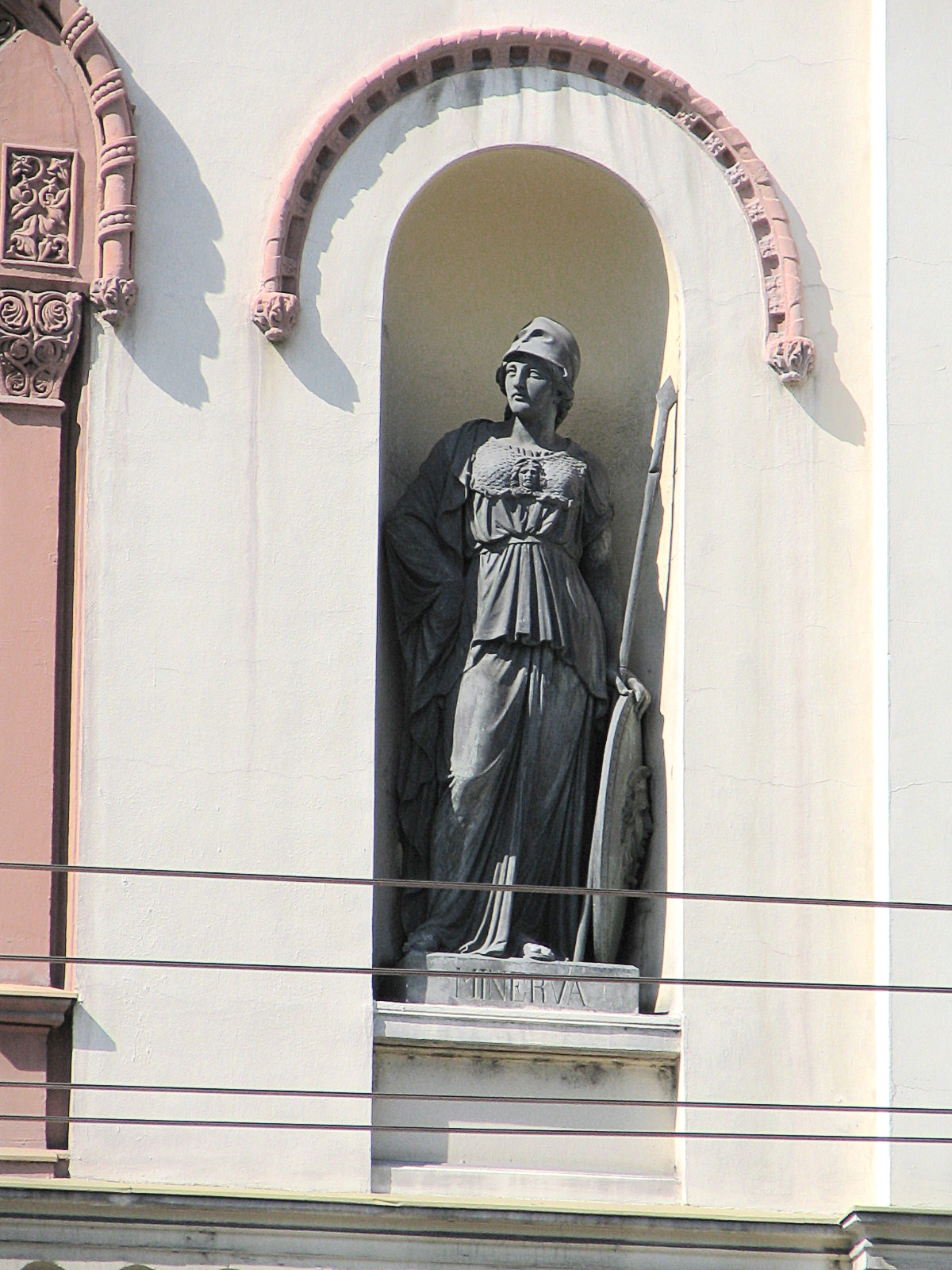
Minerva

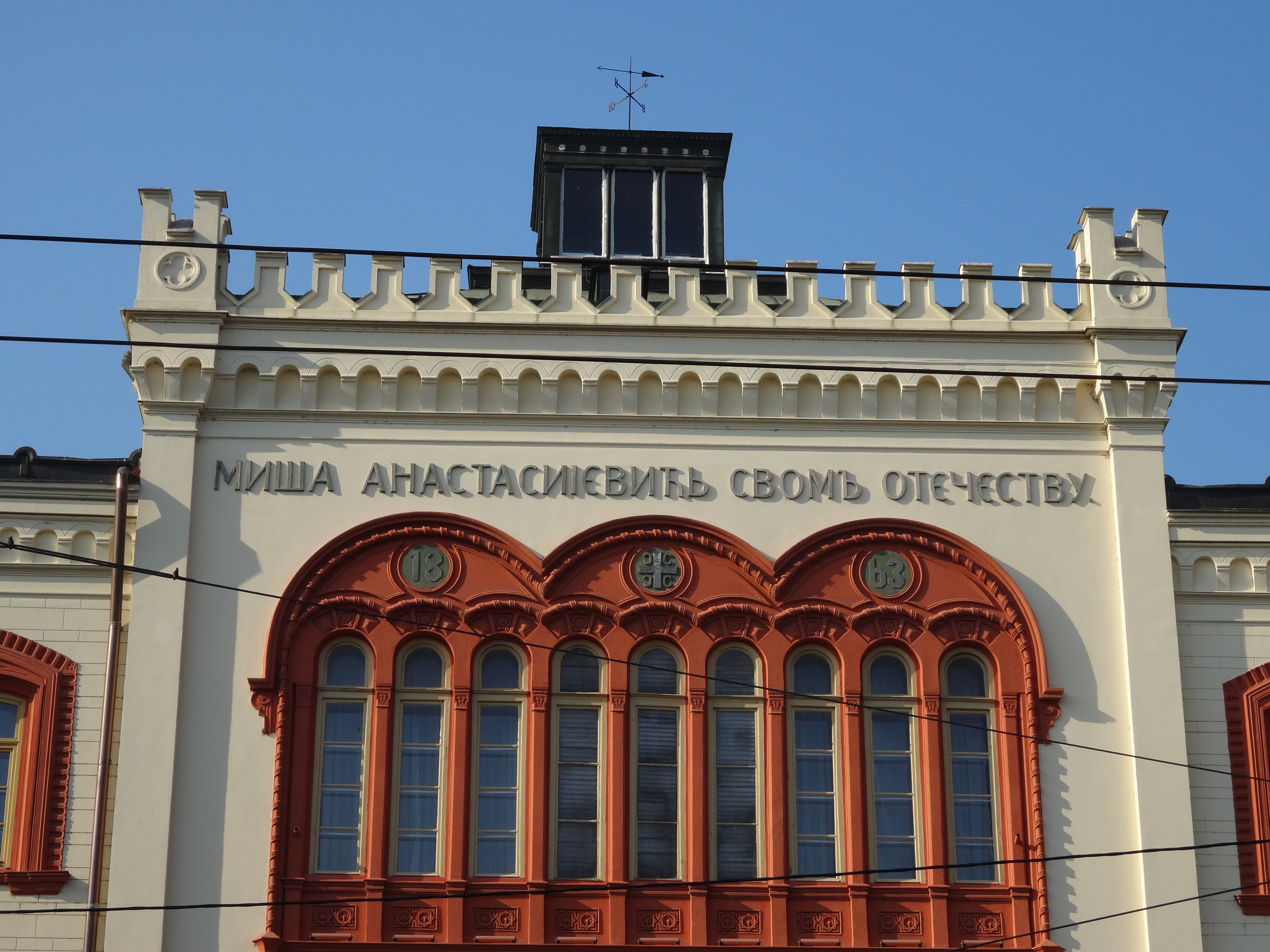
Inscription- "Miša Anastasijević, to his Fatherland"

== See also ==
- Tourism in Serbia
- University of Belgrade
- Belgrade Law School
- Monument of Culture of Exceptional Importance
