= Dřevíkov =

- Village
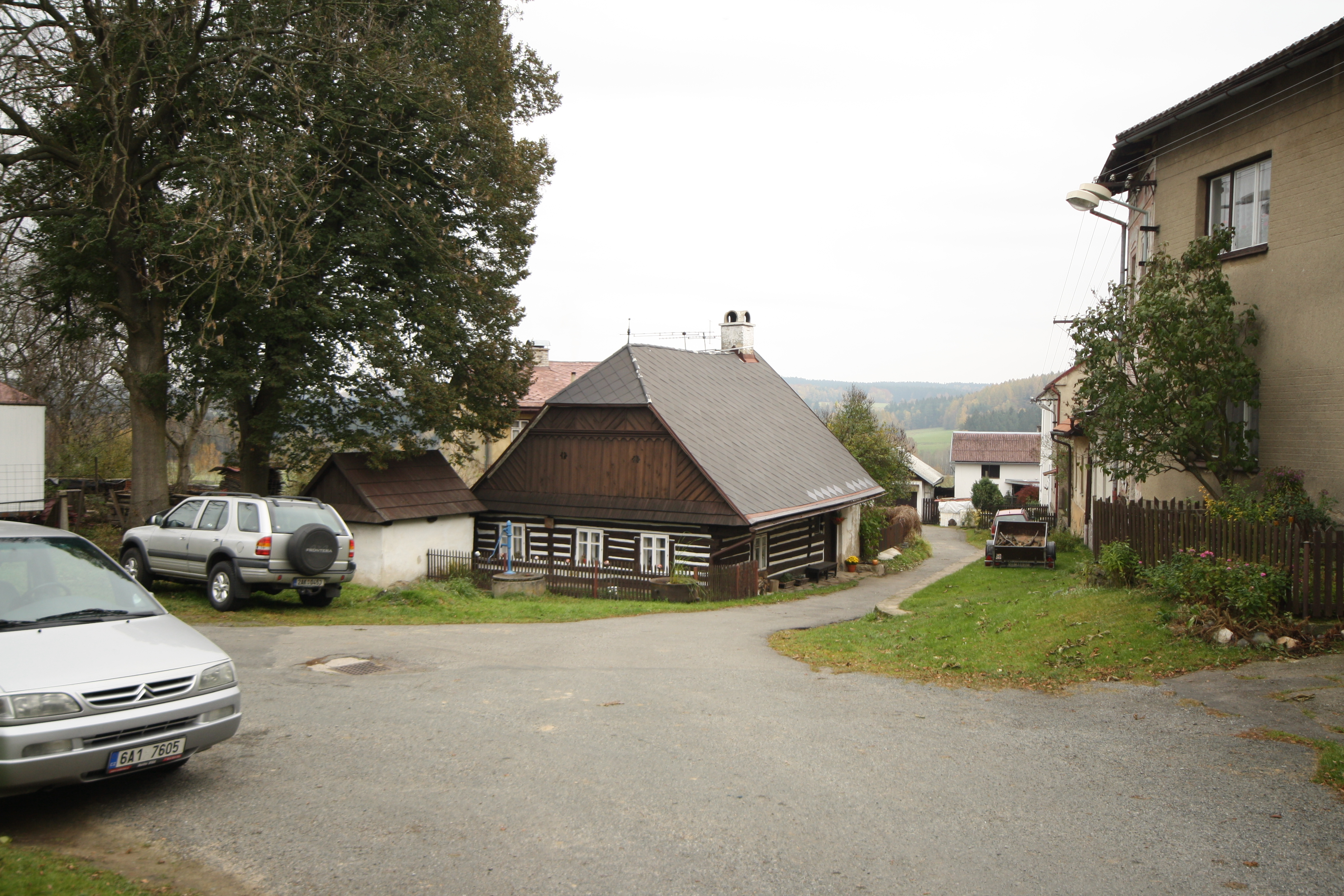
- Lower part of Dřevíkov

- Location in the Czech Republic
- Coordinates: 49°45′52″N 15°49′43″E
- Country: Czech Republic
- Region: Pardubice
- District: Chrudim
- Municipality: Vysočina
- First mentioned: 1542

Area
  - Total: 1.68 km^{2} (0.65 sq mi)
- Elevation: 569 m (1,867 ft)

Population (2021)
  - Total: 74
  - Density: 44/km^{2} (110/sq mi)
- Time zone: UTC+1 (CET)
  - Summer (DST): UTC+2 (CEST)
- Postal code: 539 01

Dřevíkov is a village and municipal part of Vysočina in Chrudim District in the Pardubice Region of the Czech Republic. It has about 70 inhabitants. It is located in the central part of the municipality.

== Etymology ==
The name is derived from the personal name Dřevík, meaning "Dřevík's (court)".

== Geography ==
Dřevíkov is located in the central part of the Vysočina municipality, about 20 kilometres (12 mi) south of Chrudim and 30 km (19 mi) south of Pardubice. It lies in the Iron Mountains and in the eponymous protected landscape area.

== History ==
The first written mention of Dřevíkov is from 1542. Since 1961, it has been a part of Vysočina.

The history of the village is connected with the Jewish community that lived here. The first Jewish settlers came to Dřevíkov in the first half of the 18th century. Between 1837 and 1849, there was at least 25 Jewish families in the village (almost half of Dřevíkov's total population). As the Jewish people gained all civil rights, they started leaving Dřevíkov. The last Jewish family left Dřevíkov in 1910.

== Demographics ==
Historical population

Year	Pop.	±%
1869	382	—
1880	311	−18.6%
1890	243	−21.9%
1900	286	+17.7%
1910	278	−2.8%

Year	Pop.	±%
1921	275	−1.1%
1930	247	−10.2%
1950	188	−23.9%
1961	213	+13.3%
1970	190	−10.8%

Year	Pop.	±%
1980	160	−15.8%
1991	111	−30.6%
2001	98	−11.7%
2011	91	−7.1%
2021	74	−18.7%

Source: Censuses

== Transport ==
The I/37 road (the section from Chrudim to Žďár nad Sázavou) runs west of the village.

== Sights ==
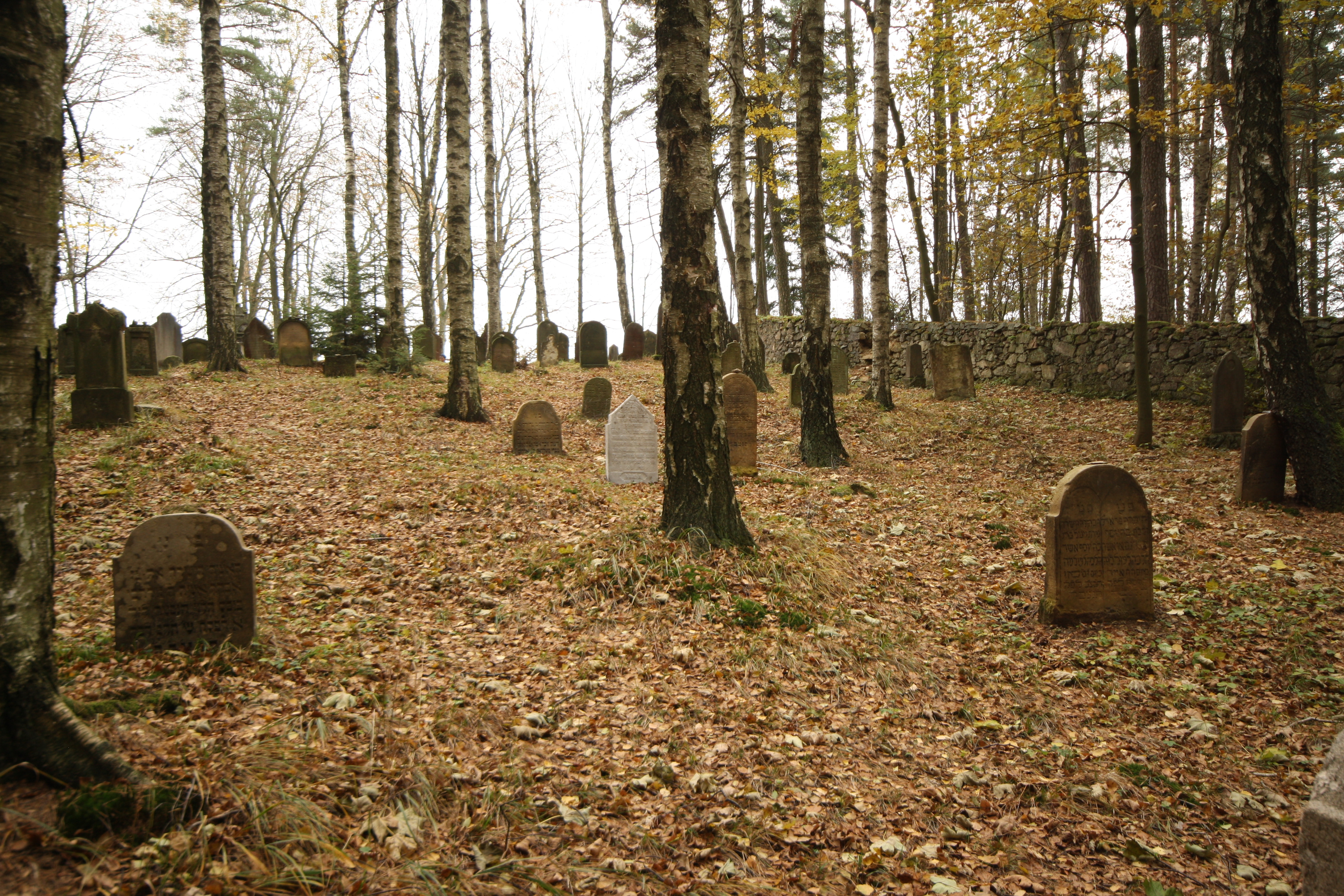
Jewish cemetery

A cultural monument is the former Jewish street, which was established after 1701, when several Jewish families moved here. The street is an example of local folk architecture. Among the buildings in the street is the former synagogue that dates from the second half of the 18th century.

The Jewish community is commemorated by the Jewish cemetery. It was founded before 1740 and expanded to its current size in 1870. It is one of the best-preserved rural Jewish cemeteries in the Czech Republic, with a collection of valuable Baroque, Neoclassical and modern tombstones.
