= Vysočina (Chrudim District) =

- Municipality
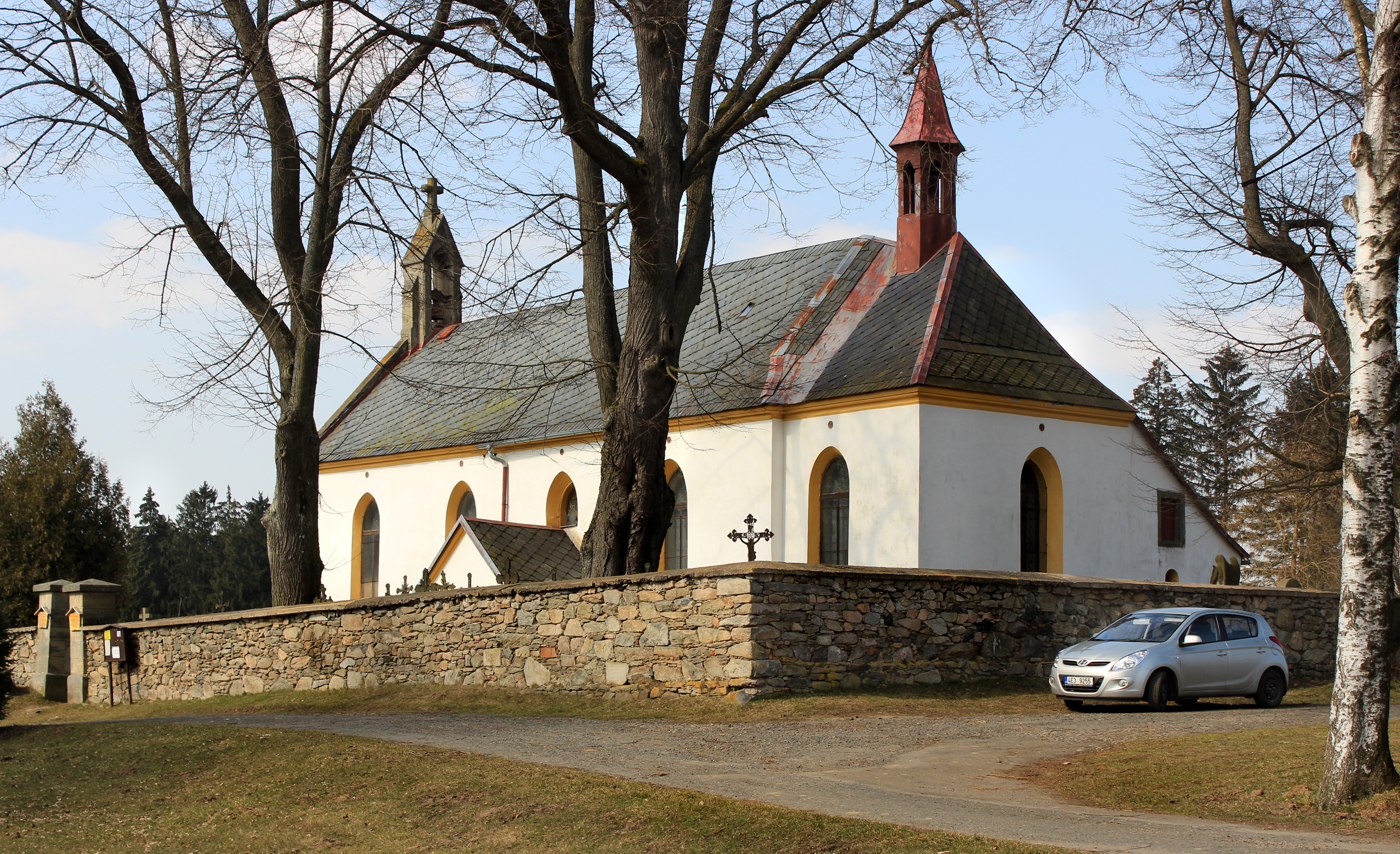
- Church of Saint Nicholas in Svatý Mikuláš

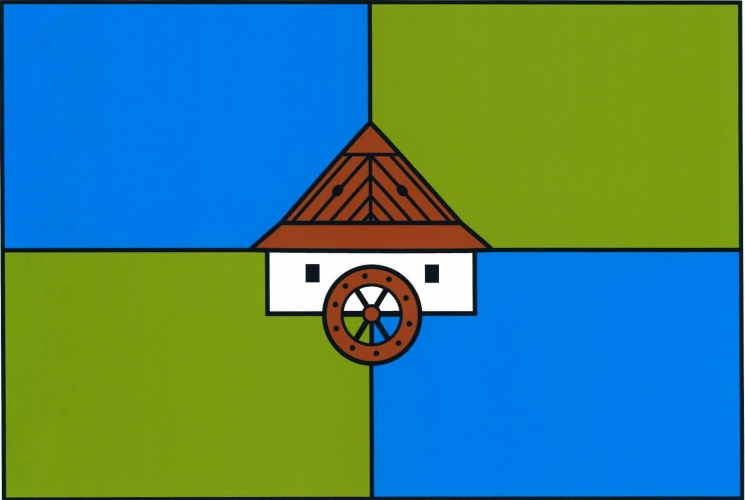
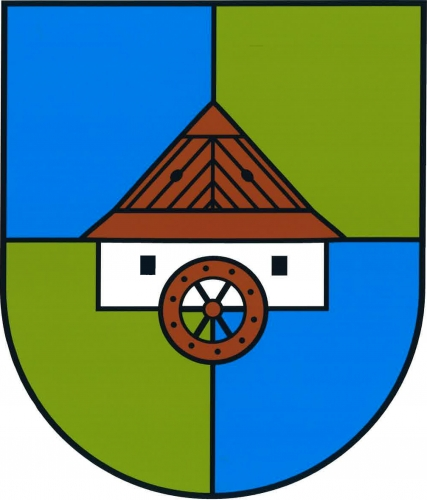
- Flag Coat of arms

- Location in the Czech Republic
- Coordinates: 49°46′11″N 15°51′11″E
- Country: Czech Republic
- Region: Pardubice
- District: Chrudim
- Established: 1961

Area
  - Total: 17.90 km^{2} (6.91 sq mi)
- Elevation: 567 m (1,860 ft)

Population (2026-01-01)
  - Total: 699
  - Density: 39.1/km^{2} (101/sq mi)
- Time zone: UTC+1 (CET)
  - Summer (DST): UTC+2 (CEST)
- Postal code: 539 01
- Website: www.obecvysocina.cz

Vysočina is a municipality in Chrudim District in the Pardubice Region of the Czech Republic. It has about 700 inhabitants. The municipality is located on the Chrudimka River in the Iron Mountains.

== Administrative division ==
Vysočina consists of seven municipal parts (in brackets population according to the 2021 census):

- Dřevíkov (74)
- Možděnice (139)
- Petrkov 1.díl (16)
- Rváčov (347)
- Svatý Mikuláš (9)
- Svobodné Hamry (77)
- Veselý Kopec (10)

The municipal office is located in Dřevíkov.

== Etymology ==
In Czech, the name Vysočina means 'highland'.

== Geography ==
Vysočina is located about 20 kilometres (12 mi) south of Chrudim and 30 km (19 mi) south of Pardubice. It lies in the Iron Mountains and in the Železné hory Protected Landscape Area. The highest point is at 649 m (2,129 ft) above sea level. The Chrudimka River flows through the municipality.

== History ==
The municipality was established on 1 January 1961 by merging the municipalities of Dřevíkov, Možděnice, Rváčov and Svobodné Hamry.

== Demographics ==
Historical population

Year	Pop.	±%
1869	1,499	—
1880	1,491	−0.5%
1890	1,398	−6.2%
1900	1,440	+3.0%
1910	1,503	+4.4%

Year	Pop.	±%
1921	1,501	−0.1%
1930	1,369	−8.8%
1950	1,022	−25.3%
1961	1,037	+1.5%
1970	914	−11.9%

Year	Pop.	±%
1980	834	−8.8%
1991	690	−17.3%
2001	707	+2.5%
2011	687	−2.8%
2021	672	−2.2%

Source: Censuses

== Transport ==
The I/37 road, which connects Hradec Králové and Pardubice with the D1 motorway, runs through the municipality.

== Sights ==
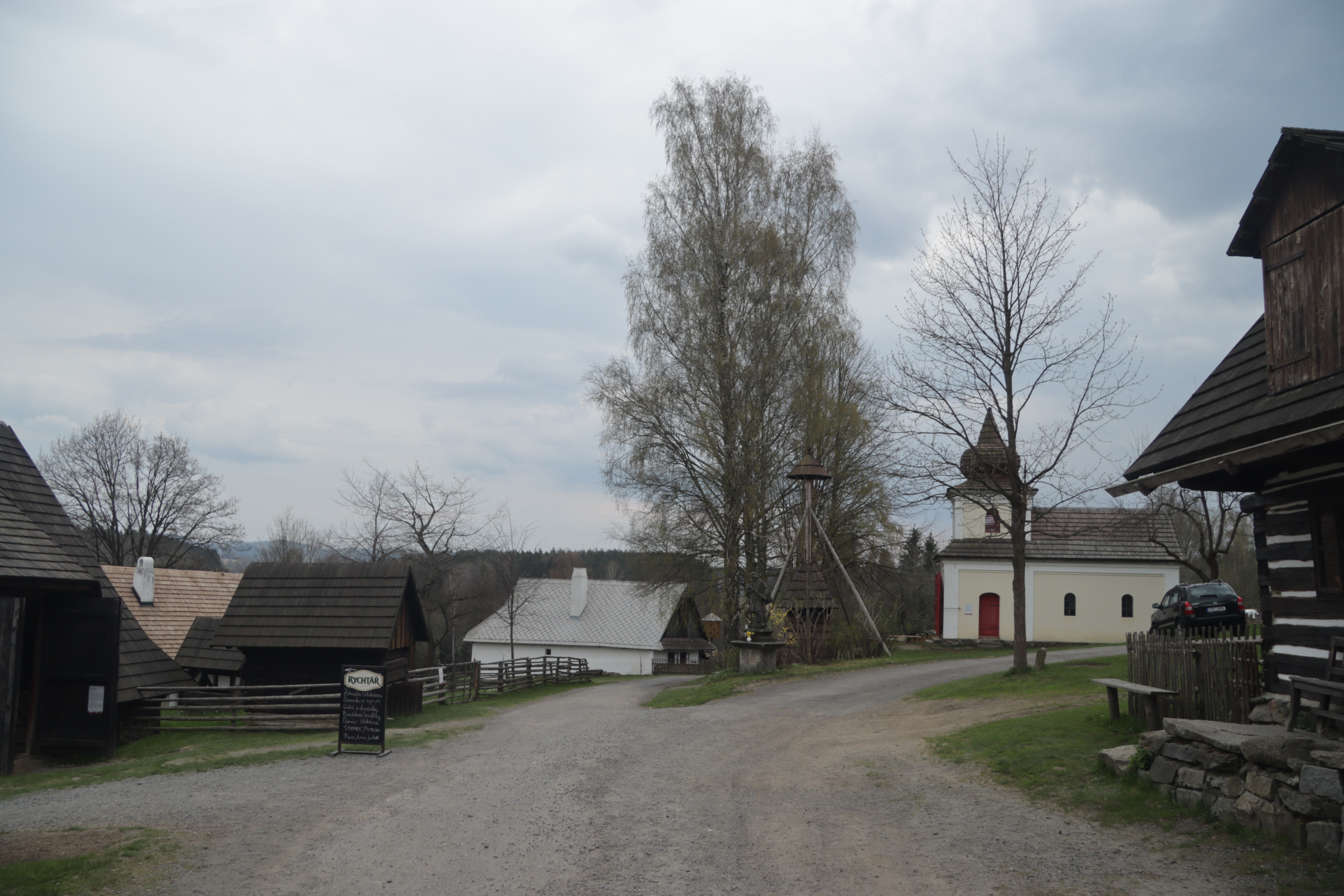
Veselý Kopec, part of the Vysočina Open-Air Museum

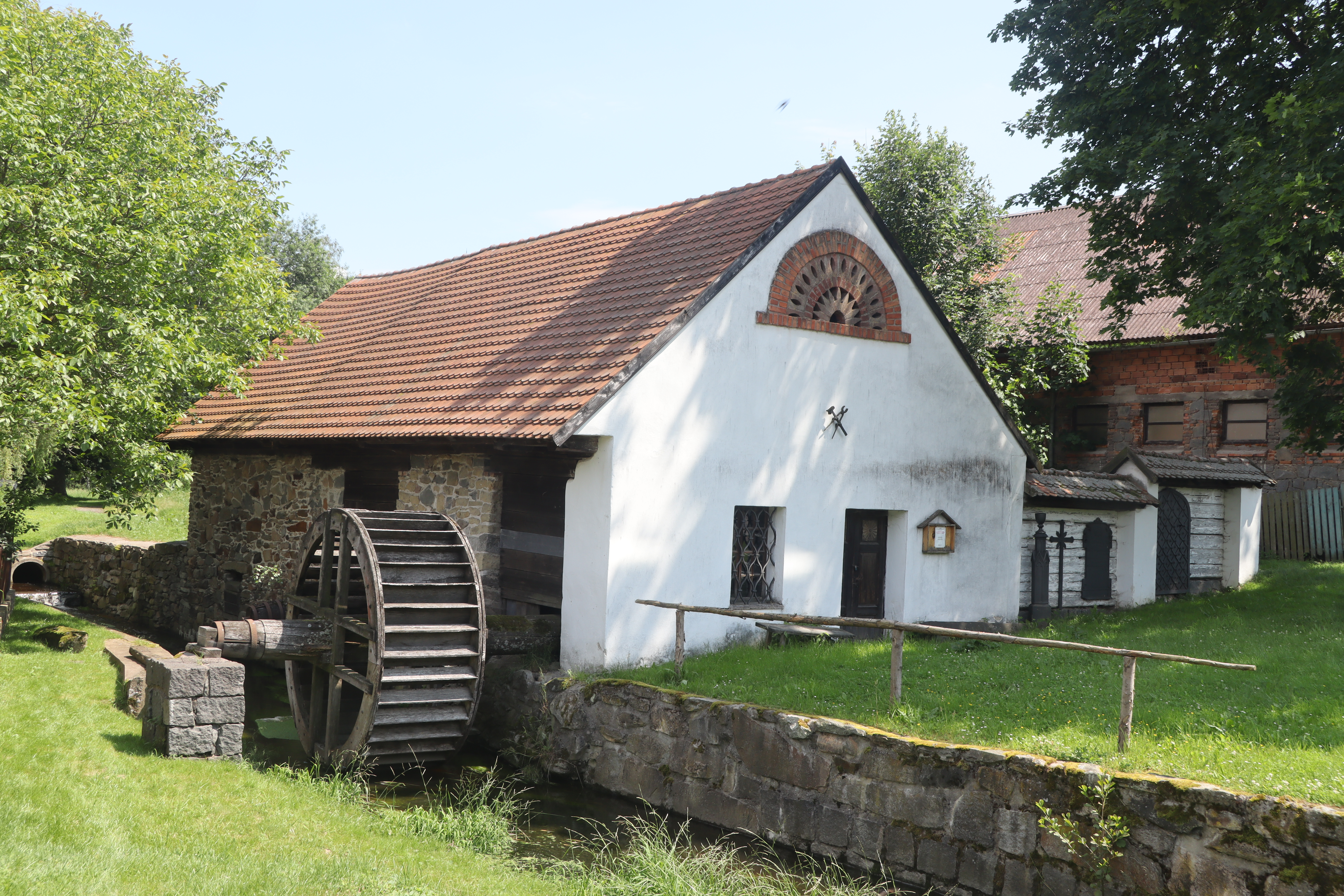
Water-powered hammer mill in Svobodné Hamry

The area of Veselý Kopec is an open-air museum with many examples of local folk architecture and folk architecture of neighbouring ethnographic regions. They were gradually moved here since the 1970s, and the only structure standing here permanently is the homestead No. 4, which is among the oldest folk architecture buildings in the Iron Mountains. The museum presents the housing and farming of small farmers from the mid-19th century to the mid-20th century. There is also a unique collection of technical monuments powered by water.

The village of Svobodné Hamry is protected as a village monument zone for its set of preserved folk architecture houses. The village was first mentioned in 1654 and it was an iron-working village, with a hammer mill from the 15th century in the centre. The water-powered hammer mill has been preserved to this day and has an exhibition there, maintained by the Vysočina Open-air Museum.

The history of Dřevíkov is connected with the Jewish community that lived there. A cultural monument is the former Jewish street, which was established after 1701, when several Jewish families moved here. The street is an example of local folk architecture. Among the buildings in the street is the former synagogue from the second half of the 18th century. The last Jewish family left Dřevíkov in 1910.

The Jewish community in Dřevíkov is commemorated by the Jewish cemetery. It was founded before 1740 and expanded to its current size in 1870. It is one of the best-preserved rural Jewish cemeteries in the Czech Republic, with a collection of valuable Baroque, Neoclassical and modern tombstones.

The main landmark of Svatý Mikuláš is the Church of Saint Nicholas. It was built in the Renaissance style at the end of the 16th century. It was expanded in 1827 and modified in the neo-Gothic style in 1886.

== Notable people ==
- Jan Nevole (1812–1903), architect; lived and died here
