= Order of Merit (Waldeck and Pyrmont) =

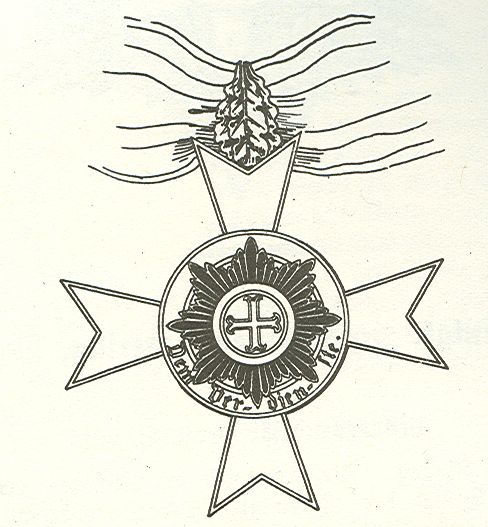
- Awarded for: Military or Civil merit
- Military Class Civil Class

The Order of Merit (Verdienstorden) was an Order of merit founded by George Victor, Prince of Waldeck and Pyrmont on the 3rd of July 1857 and was expanded between 1871 and 1899 by Georg Victor and his successor Friedrich, Prince of Waldeck and Pyrmont.

== History ==
The Order was originally founded in 1857 as a medal of merit to reward those who had distinguished themselves through meritorious actions for the Principality of Waldeck and Pyrmont, both in the civil and military spheres. With the entry of the principality into the German Empire, the Order was "re-founded" and upgraded on January 14, 1871, and officially took the name of "Order of Merit".

The end of the war brought the German revolution, which ended the Principality and brought about the Free State of Waldeck-Pyrmont. With this, the order became obsolete.

== Classes ==
The original order consisted of a single class (the Medal of Merit). With the re-founding of the Order, the Grade became the 2nd class of the new order and a higher grade of 1st class was introduced. On September 26, 1878, the 3rd class Gold medal was established, which altered the 2nd class medal to a cross, then in 1899 a 4th class silver medal, finally in 1912 a 5th class officers cross was added, which left the order as follows:

- Cross of the 1st class (or Officer)
- Cross of the 2nd class (or Knight)
- Gold Medal 3rd class
- Silver Medal 4th class
- Officer's Cross 5th class

== Description ==
- The cross is composed of a white-enamelled St. George's cross suspended from a ring embellished with a golden oak leaf. In the centre of the cross is a blue-enamelled medallion with a black brunswick star bearing the arms of the principality of Waldeck and Pyrmont. At the bottom of the medallion is the inscription "Dem verdienst" ("to merit") in gold-lettered Gothic characters. On the back of the medallion, in gold on a blue background, are the initials of the founder "GV" (Georg Victor). The first-class cross was larger than the second-class cross. The medals were respectively in gold and silver without enamelling. the Officer's cross was a silver and white enamel Maltese cross with a pinback design.
- The ribbon was either white (for the military class) or yellow (for the civilian class) with a black-red-yellow stripe on each side. On the ribbon, from 12 May 1915, two crossed swords could be affixed for all classes if the medal was awarded for war merits. From 23 February 1918 it was established that in order to obtain the crossed swords on this honour it was first necessary to obtain the Prussian Iron Cross First Class.

== Notable recipients ==
- Josias, Hereditary Prince of Waldeck and Pyrmont
- Gerd von Rundstedt
- Adolf Wild von Hohenborn
- Hermann Recknagel

== Bibliography ==
- Gert Efler: Die Orden und Ehrenzeichen des Fürstentums Waldeck und Pyrmont. Schwalmstadt 2004, ISBN 3-926621-31-1.
- Jörg Nimmergut: Deutsche Orden und Ehrenzeichen bis 1945. Band 3. Sachsen – Württemberg I. Zentralstelle für wissenschaftliche Ordenskunde, München 1999, ISBN 3-00-00-1396-2.
