= Uroš =

- Pronunciation: [ǔroʃ]
- Gender: male
- Language: Serbian

Origin
- Language: Slavic
- Origin: ѹрове urove "lords"
- Derivation: ur- (root) + oš (suffix)
- Region of origin: Serbia

Uroš (Serbian Cyrillic: Урош) is a South Slavic masculine given name used primarily by Slovenes and Serbs. This noun has been interpreted as "lords", because it usually appears in conjunction with velmõžie (велмѫжие) "magnates", as in the phrase велмѫжие и ѹрове "magnates and lords". The noun was probably borrowed from the Hungarian word úr, "master" or "lord". The suffix -oš in uroš is found in a number of Slavic given or last names, particularly those of the Croats, Serbs, Czechs, and Poles.

The name may refer to:

- Several kings and tsars called Stefan Uroš
- Grand Prince Uroš I (1112–1145)
- Grand Prince Uroš II Prvoslav (1145–1162)
- Uroš Golubović, footballer
- Uroš Spajić, footballer
- Uroš Stamatović, footballer
- Uroš Slokar, basketballer
- Uroš Tripković, basketballer
- Uroš Predić, painter
- Uroš Knežević, painter
- Uroš Đurić, painter and actor
- Uroš Lajovic, conductor
- Uroš Dojčinović, guitarist
- Uroš Umek, Slovene DJ
- Uroš Drenović, military commander

== See also ==
- Urošević
- Uroševac, place in Kosovo
