= Urošević =

Urošević (Cyrillic script: Урошевић) is a Serbian surname derived from a masculine given name Uroš. It may refer to:

- Božidar Urošević (born 1975), football goalkeeper
- Novica Urošević (1945–2009), folk singer and composer
- Slobodan Urošević (born 1994), football defender
- Srđan Urošević (born 1984), football midfielder
- Veljko Urošević (born 1978), rower
