= COVID-19 pandemic in Serbia =

- Disease: COVID-19
- Pathogen: SARS-CoV-2
- Location: Serbia
- First outbreak: Wuhan, Hubei, China
- Index case: Subotica; 6 March 2020 (2363 days ago)
- Arrival date: 6 March 2020 (disputed) (2363 days ago)
- Confirmed cases: 2,568,005
- Active cases: 4,134
- Deaths: 18,057
- Fatality rate: 0.7%
- Vaccinations: 3,354,075 (total vaccinated); 3,278,198 (fully vaccinated); 8,534,688 (doses administered)

Government website
- covid19.rs; covid19.data.gov.rs

The COVID-19 pandemic in Serbia was an outbreak of the disease COVID-19 in Serbia caused by the virus SARS-CoV-2. Its first case in Serbia was reported on 6 March 2020, and confirmed by Minister of Health Zlatibor Lončar. The case was a 43-year-old man from Bačka Topola who had travelled to Budapest.

In late June 2020, the Balkan Insight published a report based on the allegedly leaked data from the internal Government COVID-19 information system. This report stated that in reality, Serbia had recorded 632 deaths due to COVID-19 in the period from 19 March to 1 June 2020, which corresponds to 388 additional deaths caused by the virus that were not publicly reported. Additionally, according to the leaked data, the number of people who became infected in Serbia from 17 June to 20 June was at least 300 per day, while public reports never accounted for more than 96 cases per day in the same period. The number of deaths was later shown to be underreported when the regular vital statistics data were published, revealing that in June 2020 alone, the number of COVID-19 deaths was 5.2 times higher than what was initially reported. Recovery figures were also disputed, with the Public Health Institute of Montenegro formally requesting an explanation from Serbian authorities in early June following a reported recovery of 4,000 patients in one day. Earlier, the index case was also disputed after the Public Health Institute publicly revealed that the first case was registered a week before the officially reported index case.

In September 2020, NIN weekly released research results that show a significant discrepancy between the data on the number of infected persons and the number of tests that were released by the Government during July and the data that was obtained from individual public health institutions through the freedom of information requests. The discrepancy shows that the Government released data inflated the number of tests that were conducted and that the number of infected persons was decreased by at least 59% during July.

Thousands of medical doctors have signed a petition requesting the release of true data and accountability for forging the data. Several senior department chiefs at Military Medical Academy were dismissed after supporting the open letter. In August 2020 Professor Goran Belojević of the University of Belgrade Faculty of Medicine publicly stated that Serbia had registered 5,000 deaths.

On 29 September 2020, Predrag Kon, chief epidemiologist and a member of the state anti-COVID-19 Crisis Team, publicly admitted that there was a delay in data processing and that the number of deaths until the end of June was three times higher than officially reported (277). Health Minister refuted those claims the next day saying that they were "unfounded" and warned Kon against making such comments again.

As of 19 November 2022, 6,719,835 COVID-19 vaccine doses had been administered in Serbia.

== Background ==
On 12 January 2020, the World Health Organization (WHO) confirmed that a novel coronavirus was the cause of a respiratory illness in a cluster of people in Wuhan City, Hubei Province of China, which was reported to the WHO on 31 December 2019.

The case fatality ratio for COVID-19 was much lower than SARS of 2003, but the transmission was significantly higher, with a significant total death toll.

== Government response ==
=== Social measures ===
The government implemented various social measures such as restrictions and lockdowns between March and July 2020.

==== March ====
On 15 March, a state of emergency was declared. Many argue the declaration was against the constitution, since there was no debate among the MPs in the Serbian Parliament. Some experts argue an emergency situation could have been declared instead, some saying that state of an emergency was an overreaction. All schools, kindergarten and universities were closed.

On 17 March, the distant lectures were introduced. All lectures for elementary schools were aired on RTS channel (RTS 3 channel) and the web platform RTS Planeta.

On 18 March, a curfew from (20:00) to (05:00) was established across the whole country. In addition, people of the age of 65 and above were forbidden to leave their homes, with fines up to din. 150,000 (approx. US$1,500). In the first hours of curfew, several people were arrested. One woman was forced to go home, after insulting police officers and refusing to comply with the measures of the curfew.

On 20 March, cafes, bars, shopping malls and public transportation were all shut down. Food delivery, however, remained allowed.

On 21 March, the curfew was prolonged from the previous 9 hours to 12 hours. People were ordered to stay at home from (17:00) to (05:00) the next day.

On 28 March, a weekend-long curfew was enacted. Starting from (15:00) to (05:00) the next day, for both Saturday and Sunday. Pet owners can no longer take a walk for 20 minutes, between (20:00) and (21:00).

==== April ====
On 2 April, the new weekend curfew was established. Starting from (13:00) to (05:00) on Monday. Groups of no more than 2 people in public were allowed; however, this measure soon proved to be practically impossible to enforce.

On 8 April, the new weekend curfew was established. Starting from Friday on (17:00) up until Monday (05:00) in the morning. Senior citizens were allowed to go grocery shopping on Fridays from (04:00) to (07:00) in the morning.

On 17 April, the new weekend curfew before the Easter holiday (Julian calendar), was established. Starting from Friday at 17:00 to Tuesday at 05:00 in the morning.

On 18 April, it was announced that from Tuesday, 21. April, some restrictions would be lifted. Curfew was set to start from 18:00 instead from 17:00 lasting up until 05:00 in the morning the next day. Senior citizens can now choose when they want to take a 30 minutes walk from 18:00 to 01:00.

On 24 April, it was announced that the curfew would start from Friday, 24 April on 18:00 and last until Monday 27 April 5:00 in the morning. Public transportation between towns was about to be re-established. Senior citizens after 18:00, can now take a walk for a half an hour, no farther than 600 meters from their home address. Starting from next week, they can take walks for an hour instead of previous half. Starting from Monday, all the close spaced markets, beauty and cosmetic salons, fitness centres and gyms can now work.

On 26 April, due to 1st May holidays, new curfew was announced, starting from Thursday at 18:00 up until Monday to 05:00 (83 hours).

On 30 April, the previously announced curfew was reduced; the curfew was now supposed to last from Thursday at 18:00 until Saturday 05:00 (35 hours). People older than 65 can now take a walk two times on Friday during the curfew for an hour each time, whenever they like, while maintaining 600 meters the furthest distance from their residence.

==== May — July ====
On 6 May, the parliament dismissed previous its decision of state of emergency. Which meant from then on, no curfew was enforced. Though, measures of social distancing and wearing masks and gloves while using public transport remained. From 15 June, weddings can be held.

Since 1 June, mass events were allowed again. On 21 June, the 2020 Serbian parliamentary election took place – seven weeks later than planned before. On 26 June, new measures were imposed for Belgrade, from now on wearing masks was mandatory in closed spaces and in public transport. On 27 June, due to growing number of COVID-19 positives and packed hospitals with patients, new measures were taken for the south-western municipalities of Novi Pazar and Tutin. From then on, all the children playgrounds were closed, working hours of shops, markets, hair salons, bakeries, butcher shops were limited to no later than 19:00 UTC+1.

On 7 July, Aleksandar Vučić announced possible curfew between 18:00 and 06:00 from Friday to Monday. It was not clear if the curfew would affect only Belgrade or the whole country, though he emphasised he would like it to be across the country. This announcement sparked protests outside the parliament.

=== Economic measures ===
On 26 March 2020, employers can postpone paying taxes on suficit until 30 June. On 31 March, Vučić announced that all the small and medium-sized companies would receive help for the following 3 months to "survive" under the condition that they don't fire 10 percent of employees. All hairdressers shoemakers and bakers would receive a minimal wage (255.27€ as of January 2020) from the state. Every citizen older than 18, would receive 100 euros to support the spending and to support local businesses.

On 8 April, the Serbian government passed a decree on additional borrowing.

On 23 April, a previous decision to give every citizen 100 euros was revised, so than only pensioners and welfare users would receive the money, others interested in government's help, needed to inform the government if they want to receive the support from government. This decision was made, ostensibly because "some tycoons from the political area and outside were humiliated" with the previous decision to help every citizen older than 18, as they felt insulted with the amount.

=== Misinformation ===
As the number of infections rose throughout Europe, on 26 February 2020 president Aleksandar Vučić called a press conference where he addressed the possibility of the virus impacting Serbia. This news conference made headlines after a pulmonologist, Dr. Branimir Nestorović, made joking statements about the virus, calling it "the most laughable virus in the history of mankind" and suggested that women should travel to then virus-affected Italy for shopping because "estrogen protects them". The president, who was visible in the background expressing amusement and chuckling at this during the TV broadcast, later denied any accusations of portraying the virus as such by Dr. Nestorović.

In April 2020, a decree that limited access to public information about COVID-19 was announced and a journalist was arrested for writing an article on alleged shortages of medical equipment and neglect of medical staff, but after public outcry and reactions from the EU, RSF, and IPI, charges were dropped and the journalist released. The declared goal of the decree was to limit the spread of fake news about SARS-CoV-2 and COVID-19 in Serbia. On 21 April 2020, Dr. Predrag Kon, a guest on the Ćirilica TV show on Happy TV, confirmed the lack of medical supplies.

On 22 June, the BIRN (Balkan Investigative Reporting Network) released an official document from the government's COVID-19 database stating that from 19 March to 1 June, there were 632 COVID-19-related deaths, compared to 244–388 more than officially reported. The database also showed there to have been more new daily cases, between 300 and 340 compared to the official 97. Throughout the pandemic, many government critics and opposition leaders have accused the government of purposely downscaling the numbers so the vote turnout would surpass the 50% percent for the parliamentary elections.

During an interview on RTS 1, Vučić showed pictures of hospital beds, oxygen canisters and ventilators, accusing political opponents of spreading fake news to the effect that hospitals in Novi Pazar and Tutin did not have the medical equipment they needed. On 5 July, a syndicate of pharmacists and doctors accused the president of spreading untrue statements regarding the equipment and of taking credit for combating the pandemic, denying facts from Raška oblast, and presenting a false impression of the state of the Serbian healthcare system. They state that the photographs were taken on 6 April when Vučić personally had the ventilators delivered to the region. None of those photographs show ventilators in use, or the 10 ventilators claimed.

== Protests and riots ==
On 7 July 2020, a series of protests and riots began over the government announcement of the reimplementation of the curfew and the government's allegedly poor handling of the COVID-19 situation, as well as being a partial continuation of the "One of Five Million" movement. The initial demand of the protesters had been to cancel the planned reintroduction of curfew in Serbia during July, which was successfully achieved in less than 48 hours of the protest. The protesters also demanded a more technical response to the COVID-19 crisis and more factual and constructive information about the ongoing medical situation. Among other causes, the protests were driven by the crisis of democratic institutions under Aleksandar Vučić's rule and the growing concern that the president was concentrating all powers in his hands at the expense of the parliament.

== Aid ==
=== International aid ===
The countries and international organisations that have sent aid and funds to Government of Serbia, to help fight the pandemic:

- European Union donated 7.5 million euros aimed at expanding the capacity and improving the capabilities of combating the coronavirus pandemic. On 26 March, the EU financed the aid flight from China. Further 94 million euros were aimed at combating the pandemic. On 30 April, the EU and Norway have donated additional 120 ventilators and 100 additional clinical monitors.
- Kosovo donated 500.000 euros for the municipalities of Preševo, Medveđa and Bujanovac.
- Bosnia and Herzegovina sent medical teams to help the outbreak in the Sandžak region.
- Austria offered medical equipment, as well as equipment needed for temporary Hospitals, and for taking a number of patients from ICU to get treatment in Austria if needed.
- Turkey donated 100,000 protective masks, 2,000 protective suits, and 1,500 COVID-19 testing kits.
- Romania announced in June 2021 that it would begin to deliver for free 151,200 COVID-19 vaccines to another two countries to help tackle the pandemic. The donation for Serbia consists of 50,400 doses.
- Russia has donated Serbia 15,000 COVID-19 tests. Russian Air Force also flew 11 Ilyushin Il-76 planeloads of medical experts, large amount of medical equipment, technical and protective gear and 16 motor vehicles for disinfection of facilities and roads to Serbia to help it fight the coronavirus spread.
- Norway On 20 March, the Norwegian ambassador to Serbia Jern Eugen Jelstad, informed the President of Serbia of 5 million euros of aid aimed at combating the pandemic. On 30 April, Norway and the EU have donated additional 120 ventilators and 100 additional clinical monitors.
- Azerbaijan donated medical equipment.
- Qatar donated Medical equipment.
- United Arab Emirates have donated 10 tons of medical aid.
- People's Republic of China first donated Serbia COVID-19 tests and sent medical staff, who had experience combating the disease in Guangdong province.
- United States donated 6,000 coronavirus test kits for the Serbian health care system.
- Bahrain donated 67,5 tons of medical equipment, including 20 ventilators.
- World Health Organization donated medical equipment worth 1 million euros.

=== Personal donations ===
- Their Royal Highness Crown Prince Alexander and Crown Princess Katherine in collaboration with project c.u.r.e. and lifeline New York provide humanitarian assistance to hospitals in Serbia .
- Retired tennis player Ana Ivanovic donated 35 ventilators and medical aid packages.
- Football manager Dejan Stanković and his business partner Dragan Ruvarac donated ventilators and medical equipment.
- World No. 1 tennis player Novak Đoković donated 1 million euros for ventilators and medical aid packages.
- NBA players Nemanja Bjelica, Bogdan Bogdanović and basketball executive Vlade Divac have donated ventilators, masks and medical equipment.
- On 1 July, tennis player Novak Đoković have donated 5 million dinars to Novi Pazar

=== International aid that Serbia sent ===
- United Nations Serbia donated a total of 2 million euros, 1 million euros for the vaccine and 1 million euros to World Health Organization.
- Kosovo Government of Serbia donated 1,000 coronavirus test kits to the Public Health Institute in Pristina, as part of the region's co-operation with Kosovo in the fight against COVID-19.
- Bosnia and Herzegovina Serbia donated medical equipment to Bosnia and Herzegovina. Most help went to Republika Srpska.
- Italy On 25 April, Serbia sent 8 planes with medical aid to Italy, containing 2 million surgical masks, 2 million epidemiological masks, 1 million gloves and 100 thousand medical suits.
- Armenia On 18 June. and 19., Serbia sent 2 planes with medical aid to Armenia, containing 10 artificial respiration devices, 10 monitors monitoring the patient's condition, 500,000 surgical masks, 100,000 breathing masks, 25,000 protective glasses, 25,000 medical protective clothing and other necessary items.
- Iran Serbia announced plans to send 50,000 Sputnik vaccines to Iran, citing them as a traditional friend of Serbia.
- Lebanon On 17 August 2021, Serbia sent 40,000 Sputnik vaccines to Lebanon and intended to provide further support in the form of food aid.

== Notable deaths ==
- Miša Aleksić, 67, musician and bass guitarist of Serbian rock band Riblja Čorba
- Alex Andjelić, 80, ice hockey coach
- Đorđe Balašević, 67, singer-songwriter
- Ivan Bekjarev, 74, actor
- Branislav Blažić, 63, surgeon and politician, former Minister of Environmental Protection
- Dragoljub Đuričić, 68, drummer, former member of bands YU Grupa, Leb i sol and Kerber
- Petar Fajfrić, 79, handball player and coach
- Sanja Ilić, 69, composer and keyboardist, leader of the group Balkanika
- Irinej, 90, Head of the Serbian Orthodox Church (since 2010) and Bishop of Niš (1975–2010)
- Danial Jahić, 41, Olympic long jumper
- Borisav Jović, 92, President of Yugoslavia (1990–1991)
- Ivan Klajn, 84, linguist and academic
- Milutin Knežević, 71, Serbian Orthodox bishop of Eparchy of Valjevo
- Miodrag Lazić, 64, Surgeon, director of the Niš Urgent Medical Centre, highly esteemed military surgeon, volunteer in the Republic of Serbian Krajina (1991–1992) and Republika Srpska (1992–1996).
- Božidar Milenković, 66, footballer and coach
- Nenad Nenadović, 56, actor
- Ilija Petković, 74, footballer and manager, former Serbia national football team manager
- Artemije Radosavljević, 85, retired Serbian Orthodox bishop
- Amfilohije, Metropolitan of Montenegro, 82, Archbishop of Montenegro and the Littoral (since 1990) and Bishop of Banat (1985–1990) of the Serbian Orthodox Church
- Milenko Savović, 60, basketball player
- Zoran Stanković, 66, doctor and politician
- Miloš Šobajić, 75, painter and sculptor
- Marina Tucaković, 67, songwriter
- Vlasta Velisavljević, 94, actor
- Zoran Simjanović, 74, composer
- Marko Živić, 49, actor
- Predrag Živković Tozovac, 86, singer and composer

== Statistics ==
=== Cases ===
Total confirmed cases, recoveries and deaths

New cases per day

=== Recoveries ===
Sudden jump in number of recoveries since 6 June was explained by changed methodology of determining healthy patients, requiring only one negative COVID-19 PCR test, as opposed to two negative test at least 24 hours apart required before.

Total recoveries

Recoveries per day

=== Deaths ===
Total number of deaths

Deaths per day

Data acquired from the official website.

== See also ==
- COVID-19 pandemic in Europe
- COVID-19 pandemic by country and territory
- COVID-19 pandemic in Kosovo
- Health in Serbia
- Healthcare in Serbia
- Coronavirus
- COVID-19 pandemic
- COVID-19 vaccine
- COVID-19 drug development
