= Bogoštica =

Coordinates: 44°19′41.88″N 19°24′15.84″E

- Village (Selo)
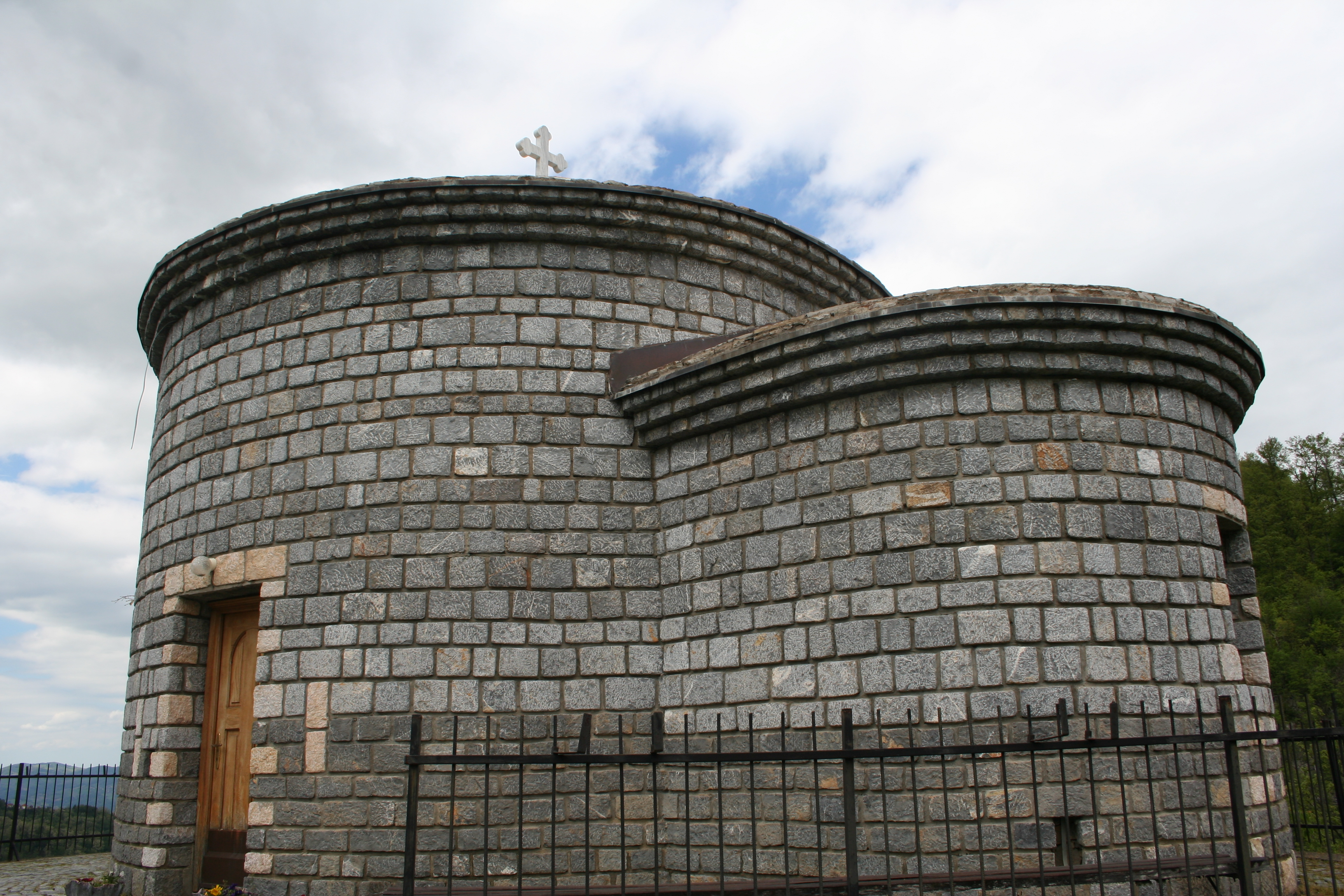
- Interactive map of Bogoštica
- Country: Serbia
- Municipality: Krupanj
- Time zone: UTC+1 (CET)
  - Summer (DST): UTC+2 (CEST)

Bogoštica (Serbian Cyrillic: Богоштица) is a village in Serbia. It is situated in the Krupanj municipality, in the Mačva District of Central Serbia. The village had a Serb ethnic majority and a population of 269 in 2002.

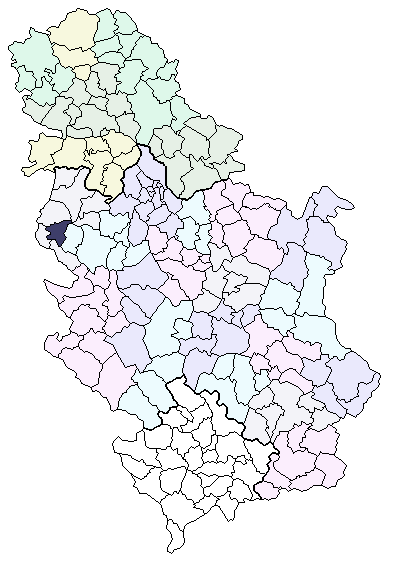
Location of the Krupanj municipality in Serbia

== Historical population ==
- 1948: 490
- 1953: 551
- 1961: 513
- 1971: 442
- 1981: 356
- 1991: 327
- 2002: 285

== Notable individuals ==
- Lavrentije Trifunović

== See also ==
- List of places in Serbia
