= Lavrentije Trifunović =

Serbian Orthodox bishop (1935–2022)

His Grace Lavrentije Trifunović
- Bishop
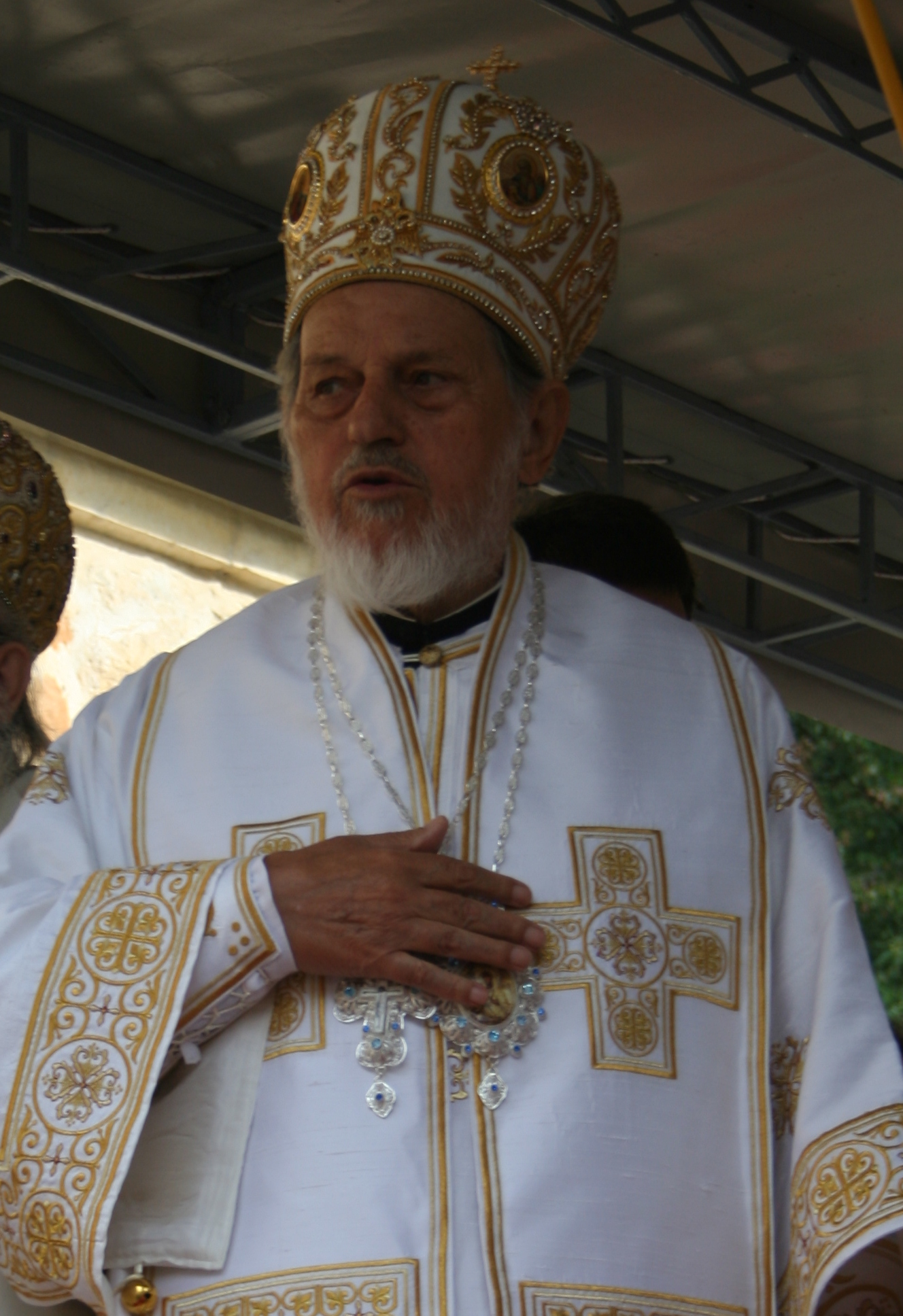
- Bishop Lavrentije in 2017
- Church: Serbian Orthodox
- Diocese: Šabac
- Installed: 2006

Personal details
- Born: Živko Trifunović; 27 January 1935 Bogoštica, Yugoslavia
- Died: 23 January 2022 (aged 86) Šabac, Serbia

Lavrentije Trifunović (Serbian Cyrillic: Лаврентије Трифуновић; 27 January 1935 – 23 January 2022) was a Serbian Orthodox bishop. He was the Bishop of Šabac between 2006 and his death. Formerly, he was Bishop of Šabac and Valjevo (1989–2006), Bishop of Western Europe (1973–1989), Bishop of Western Europe and Australia (1969–1973) and Vicar Bishop of Moravica (1967–1969). Lavrentije spoke English, German and Russian. He was a member of the Holy Synod of Bishops between 2002 and 2004.

== Biography ==
Lavrentije was born as Živko Trifunović in the village of Bogoštica near Krupanj, district of Rađevina, on Saint Sava day on 27 January 1935. He finished elementary school in Krupanj, and two grades of high school in Loznica, the Orthodox Theological Seminary and the Faculty of Theology in Belgrade.

He was ordained to the rank of hierodeacon in 1958, and to the rank of hieromonk in 1961. For two years he was a clergyman of the Ružica Church in Kalemegdan in Belgrade, after that a parish priest in Kupres. For two and a half years he was a professor of theology at Krka Monastery and at the same time a parish priest in Ivoševci. He was elected to the episcopal rank on 1 June 1967, and ordained on 16 August 1967 in St. Michael's Cathedral, Belgrade. Between 1967 and 1969, he was a vicar bishop of Moravica in Belgrade.

=== Bishop ===
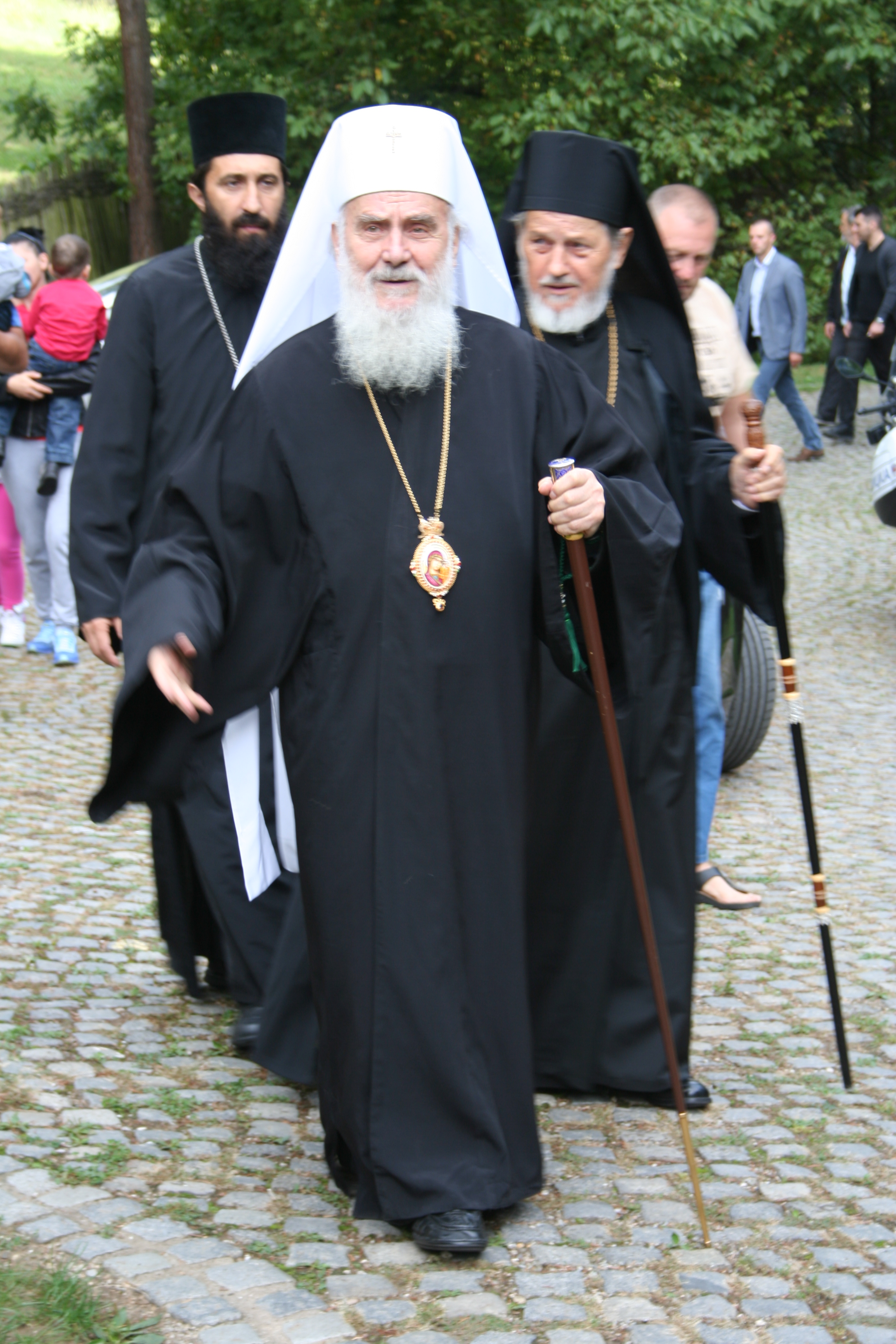
Bishop Lavrentije (right) accompanied by Serbian Patriarch Irinej, arrives to celebrate the 700th anniversary of the Tronoša Monastery

In 1969 Lavrentije was appointed diocesan bishop of the Eparchy of Western Europe and Australia, and enthroned in March 1969 in London. After the establishment of a separate diocese in Australia, his title was changed to Bishop of Western Europe in 1973. In Himmelsthür, Germany, he founded a diocesan center. He first bought an existing church building for the Serbian Orthodox Church, then founded a printing house there and published the works of Nikolaj Velimirović and many other theological and patristics books. At that time, the works of Bishop Nikolaj could not be printed in the former Communist Yugoslavia.

After a full twenty years of episcopal experience in the diaspora, the Holy Synod of Bishops of the Serbian Orthodox Church elected him in 1989 for the bishop of Šabac and Valjevo. He was enthroned in Šabac on 23 July 1989. In that position, he succeeded the late bishop Jovan Velimirović. He continued the activities of his predecessor through the missionary publishing house "Glas Crkve" of the Diocese of Šabac and Valjevo, they printed a large number of books, established an Orthodox radio and TV station.

He is notable for the renovation and construction of new churches, he founded a new Soko monastery at Soko grad. As part of this endowment, there is a museum dedicated to Nikolaj Velimirović. Through his efforts, the relics of Nikolaj were brought from America to Serbia on 12 May 1991 and are kept in the Lelić monastery.

As a representative and envoy of the Serbian Orthodox Church, he participated in many inter-church meetings and gave lectures and reports. He was the editor of the magazine "Orthodox Missionary" (since 1998), and he has written several books.

At his suggestion, in May 2006, the Holy Synod of Bishops divided the large Diocese of Šabac and Valjevo into two dioceses: Diocese of Šabac and Diocese of Valjevo. Since then, Lavrentije has been the bishop of Šabac, and Milutin Knežević, until then the Bishop of Australia and New Zealand, has been appointed bishop of Valjevo.

Lavrentije collected medical aid in Europe, where he previously served as a bishop, in the form of beds and apparatus for dialysis for the Šabac hospital in 2012. He received the Order of Saint Arsenije Sremac from the Diocese of Srem in 2016 and Order of St. Sava of the first degree in 2017. He solemnly marked half a century of hierarchical service in July 2017. He was awarded the Order of the Holy Bishop Nikolaj of the Diocese of Valjevo. Since 20 September 2019, he has been an honorary citizen of Krupanj. Between 31 March 2020 and June 2021, he was administrator of the Diocese of Valjevo.

He died at the Spiritual St. Saba Centre in Šabac, on 23 January 2022, at the age of 86.

== Literature ==
- Пузовић, Предраг (1996). "Епархије Српске православне цркве у расејању" (PDF). Богословље: Часопис Православног богословског факултета у Београду. 40 (1–2): 87–96. Archived from the original (PDF) on 8 June 2019.

Eastern Orthodox Church titles
New diocese	Bishop of Western Europe and Australia; 1969—1973	Succeeded by Himself; Nikolaj Mrđa as Bishop of Western Europe and Bishop of Australia
Preceded by Himself as Bishop of Western Europe and Australia	Bishop of Western Europe; 1973—1989	Succeeded by Damaskin Davidović
Preceded by Jovan Velimirović	Bishop of Šabac and Valjevo; 1989—2006	Succeeded by Himself; Milutin Knežević as Bishop of Šabac and Bishop of Valjevo
Preceded by Himself as Bishop of Šabac and Valjevo	Bishop of Šabac; 2006–2022	Succeeded by Jerotej Petrović
