= Vidova =

- Village
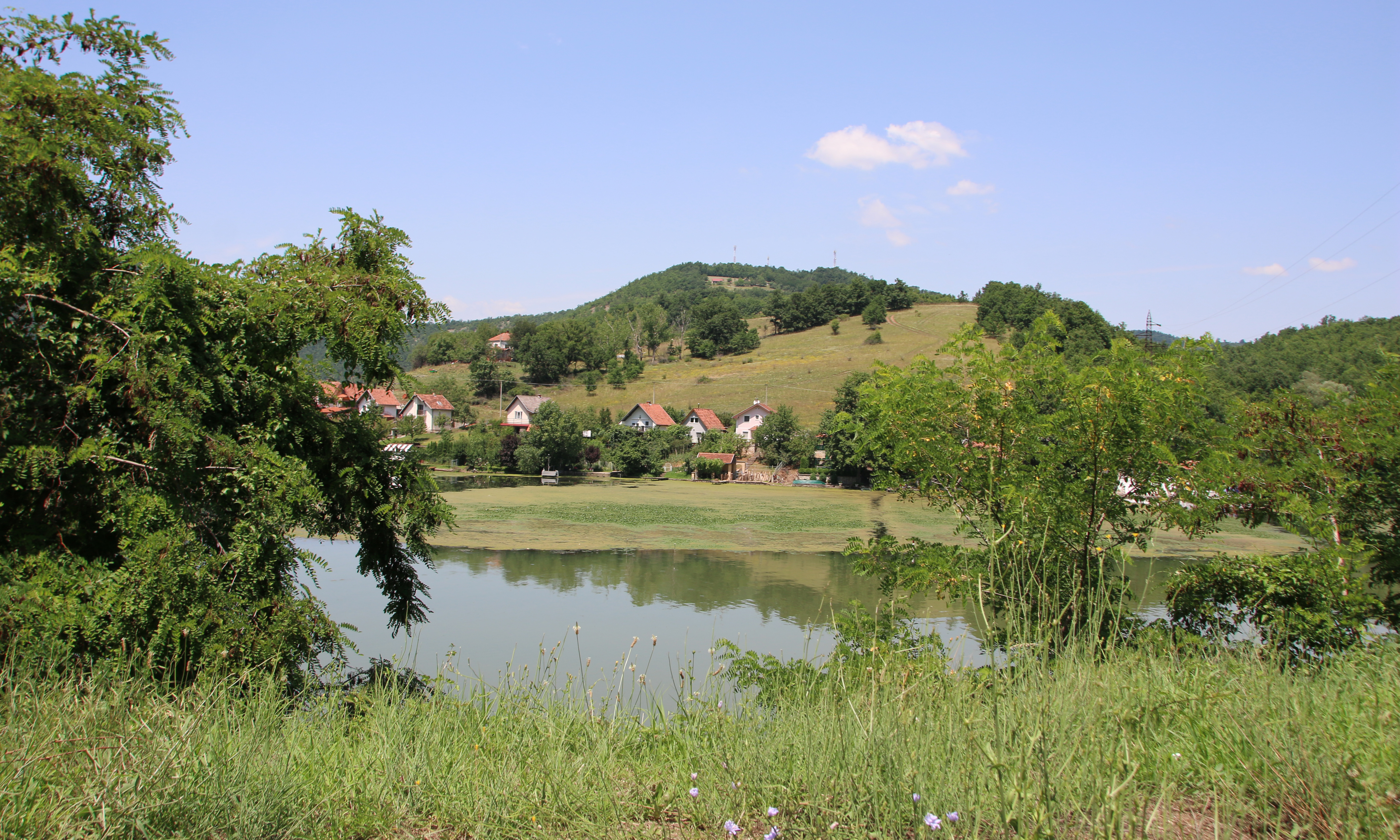

- Location within Serbia
- Coordinates: 43°54′51″N 20°15′12″E
- Country: Serbia
- District: Moravica District
- Municipality: Čačak

Area
  - Total: 4.86 km^{2} (1.88 sq mi)
- Elevation: 258 m (846 ft)

Population (2011)
  - Total: 121
  - Density: 24.9/km^{2} (64.5/sq mi)
- Time zone: UTC+1 (CET)
  - Summer (DST): UTC+2 (CEST)

Vidova is a village in the municipality of Čačak, Serbia. According to the 2011 census, the village has a population of 121 people.

== Notable individuals ==
- Irinej, Serbian Patriarch
