= Milutin Knežević =

Serbian Orthodox bishop (1949–2020)

His Grace Milutin (Knežević)
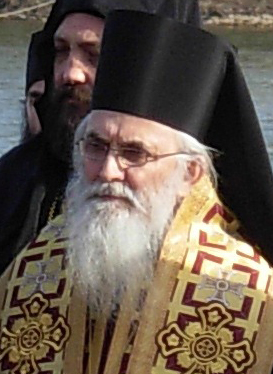
- Bishop Milutin in 2012
- Born: Mihailo Knežević; 10 January 1949; Mijači, Valjevo, PR Serbia, FPR Yugoslavia
- Died: 30 March 2020 (aged 71); Belgrade, Serbia
- Title: Bishop (Serbian Orthodox Church)

Milutin Knežević (Serbian Cyrillic: Милутин Кнежевић; 10 January 1949 – 30 March 2020) was a Serbian Orthodox prelate, Bishop of the Eparchy of Australia and New Zealand between 2003 and 2006, and the Eparchy of Valjevo from 2006 to 2020. He died on 30 March 2020, from complications due to COVID-19.

== Biography ==
He was born as Mihailo Knežević on 10 January 1949 in Mijači, near Valjevo, in a Serbian Orthodox family. He was baptized in the renowned Pustinja Monastery.

In 1963, at age of 14 after he finished elementary school he went to the Kaona Monastery. On 26 October 1963 in the Petkovica Monastery bishop Jovan Velimirović of Šabac and Valjevo tonsured him monk with name Milutin in honour of medieval king Stefan Uroš II Milutin of Serbia. On the next day he was ordained hierodeacon and 8 November of same year as hieromonk at Osečina, near Valjevo. He started attending the monastic secondary school in the Ostrog Monastery in 1967, and afterwards he returned to Kaona Monastery where he becomes its head and priest.

Later he studied at the Theological School of St. Sava in Belgrade. Having spent one academic year at the Belgrade Theological Faculty, he continued his studies in the United States at the Theological Faculty of St. Sava in Libertyville, Illinois, and graduated from it with best marks. For six months he was the secretary of the Serbian Orthodox Diocese of Canada, and for six months he was the parish priest in Niagara Falls.

After that he returned to Serbia and thereafter joined again his Kaona Monastery and contributed a great deal to improvement of it as a spiritual centre. In 1981 bishop Jovan Velimirović promoted him to the rank of syncellus and to a protosyncellus in 1987. In 1994 bishop Lavrentije Trifunović promoted him to the rank of hegumen and to the rank of archimandrite in 1988.

In mid-2003, Counsil of Bishops of the Serbian Orthodox Church elected him Bishop of Australia and New Zealand. On 20 July 2003, at St. Michael's Cathedral, Belgrade, Patriarch Pavle of Serbia, along with Metropolitans Nikolaj Mrđa of Dabro and Bosnia, Amfilohije Radović of Montenegro and the Littoral, and Bishops Longin Krčo of New Gračanica, Lavrentije Trifunović of Sabac and Valjevo, Irinej Gavrilović of Niš, Irinej Bulović of Bačka, Georgije Đokić of Canada and Dositej Motika of Scandinavia and Britain consecrated him bishop. He was enthroned on 30 December of same year at St. Sava Monastery in Canberra, by his predecessor in Australia and New Zealand, Nikanor Bogunović.

On 27 May 2006, Bishop Milutin was appointed to the restored Diocese of Valjevo. His enthronement took place on 26 September in the Church of the Resurrection of the Lord in Valjevo.

He died on 30 March 2020, at University Hospital Center Dr Dragiša Mišović in Belgrade, due to complications from the COVID-19 infection. He became first Eastern Orthodox bishop who died of COVID-19.

Serbian Orthodox Church titles
Preceded by Nikanor Bogunović	Bishop of Australia and New Zealand; 2003 – 2006	Succeeded by Irinej Dobrijević
New diocese	Bishop of Valjevo; 2006 – 2020	Succeeded by Isihije Rogić
