= Eparchy of Valjevo =

Diocese of the Serbian Orthodox Church

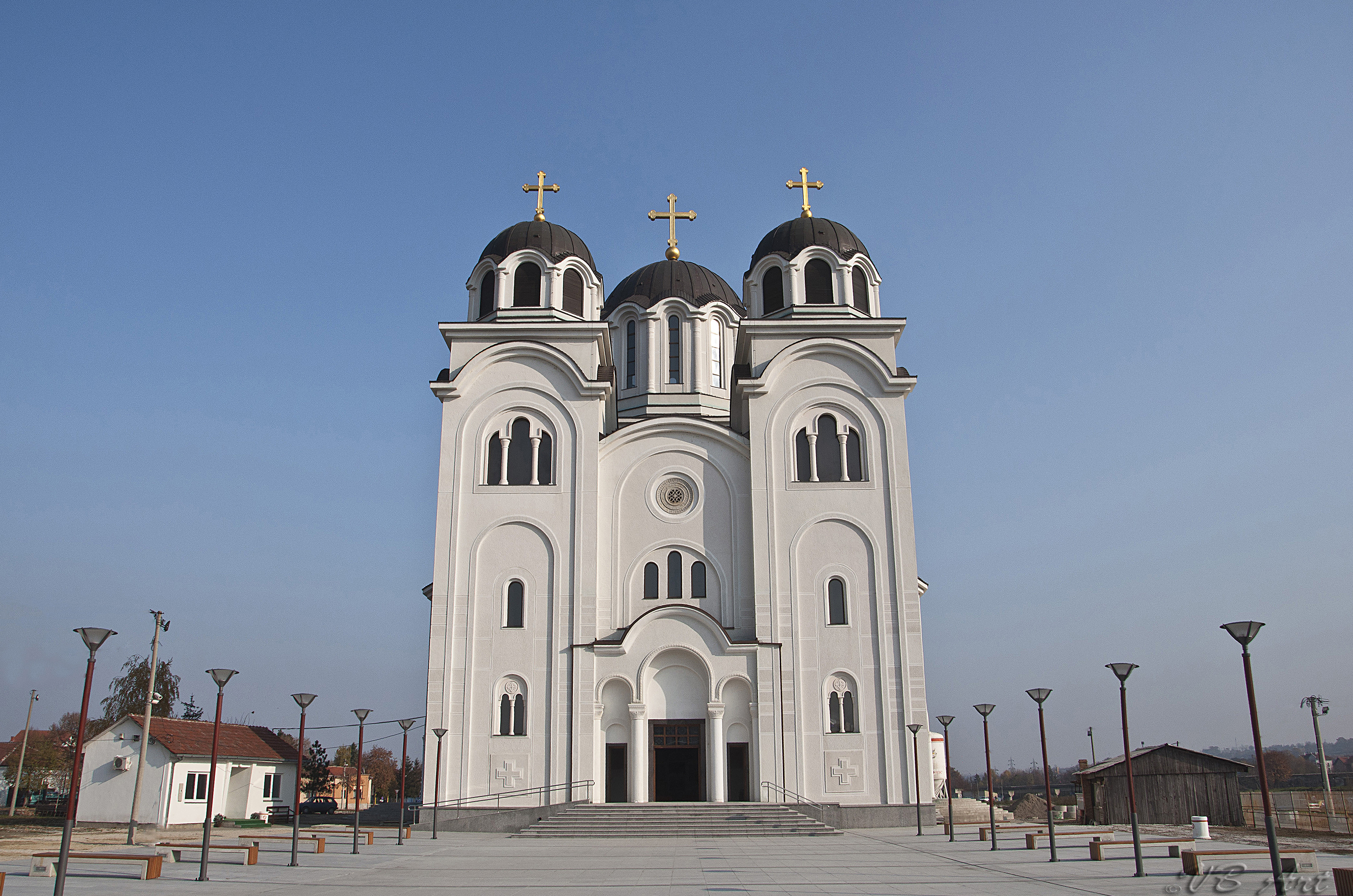
- Cathedral of the Resurrection of the Lord, Valjevo

Location
- Territory: Kolubara District
- Headquarters: Valjevo, Serbia

Information
- Denomination: Eastern Orthodox
- Sui iuris church: Serbian Orthodox Church
- Established: 2006
- Cathedral: Cathedral of the Resurrection of the Lord, Valjevo
- Language: Church Slavonic, Serbian

Current leadership
- Bishop: Isihije Rogić

Map

Website
- Eparchy of Valjevo

The Eparchy of Valjevo (Serbian: Епархија ваљевска, romanized: Eparhija valjevska) is a diocese (eparchy) of the Serbian Orthodox Church, covering Kolubara District in Serbia.

The episcopal see is located at the Cathedral of the Resurrection of the Lord, Valjevo. Its headquarters and bishop's residence are also in Valjevo.

== List of bishops ==
- Milutin Knežević (2006–2020)
- Lavrentije Trifunović (administrator) (2020–2021)
- Isihije Rogić (2021–present)

== Notable monasteries ==
- Bogovađa
- Ćelije

== Gallery ==
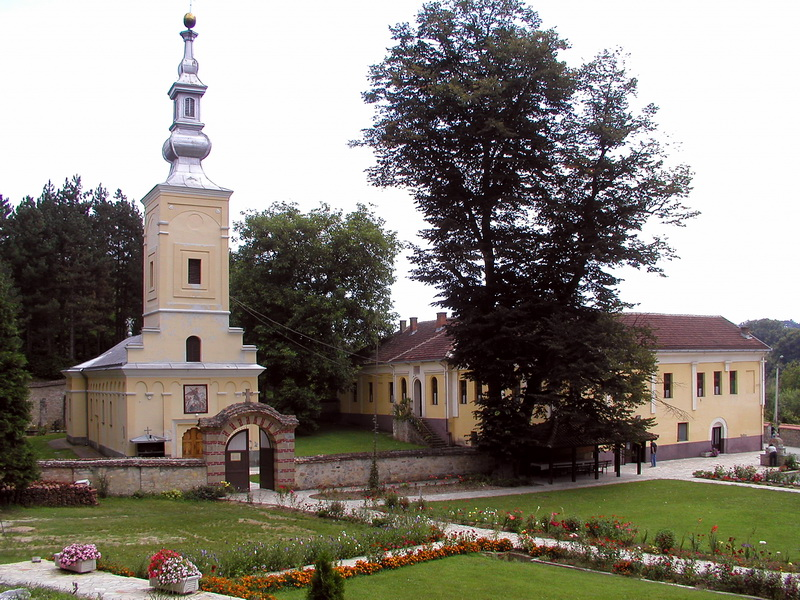
Bogovađa Monastery

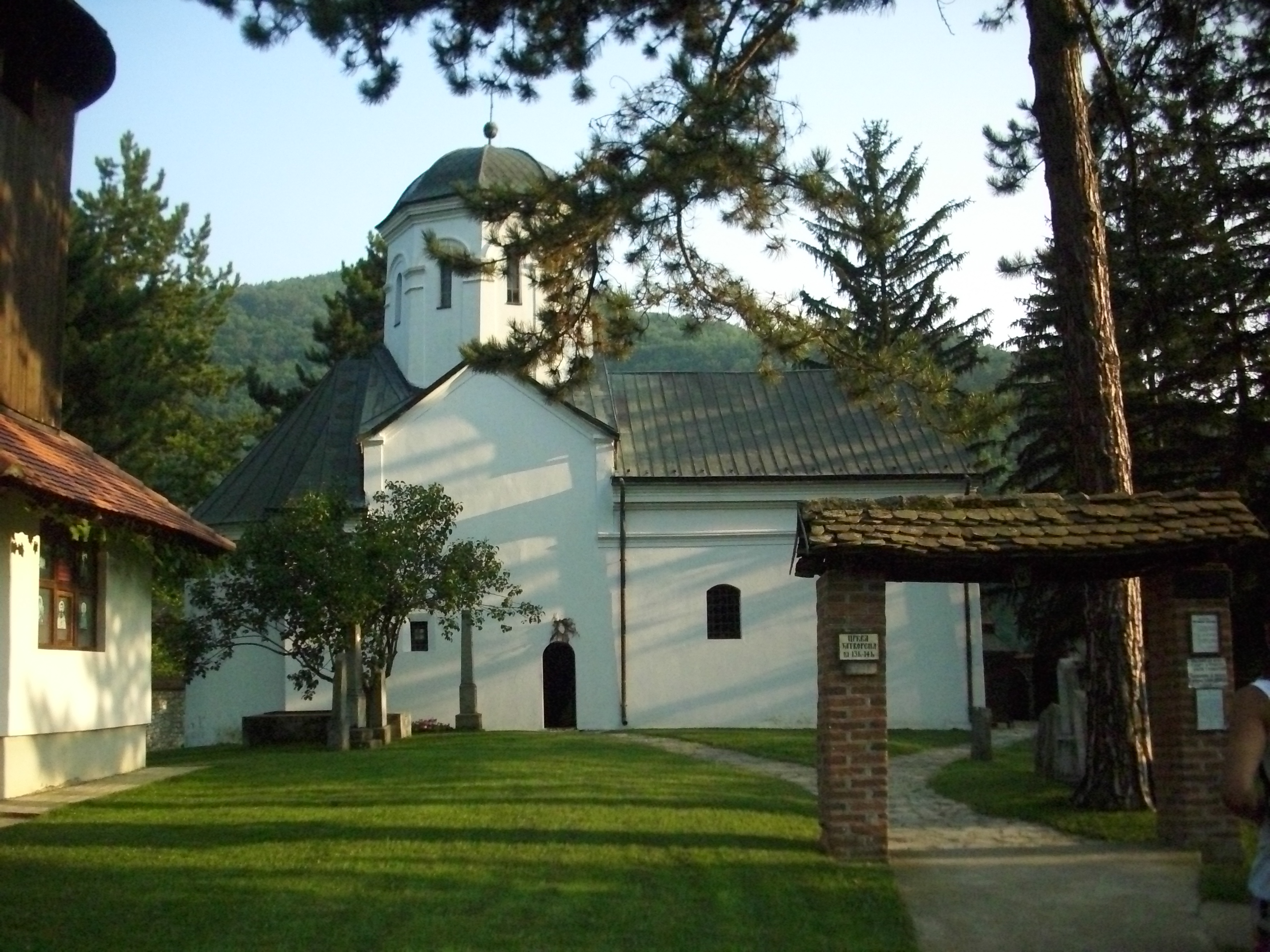
Ćelije Monastery

== See also ==
- Eparchies and metropolitanates of the Serbian Orthodox Church
