= Project C.U.R.E. =

Project C.U.R.E
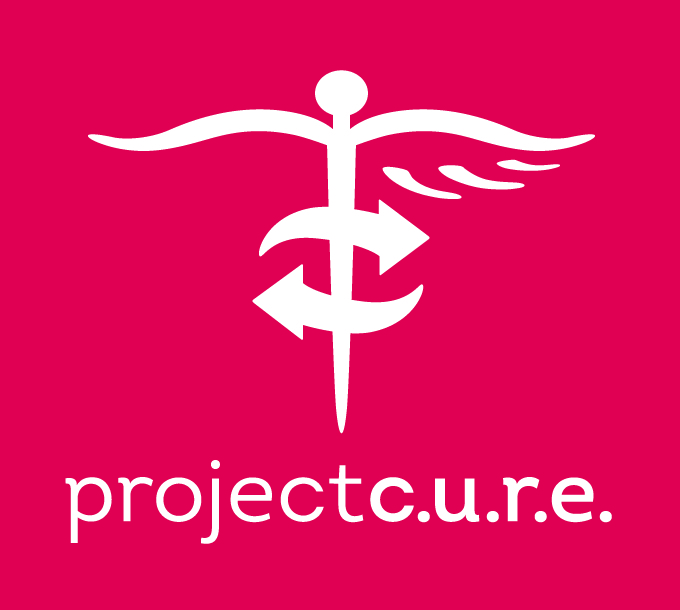
- Formation: 1987
- Type: INGO
- Legal status: 501(c)(3) nonprofit
- Headquarters: Centennial, Colorado, United States
- Location: Arizona (Phoenix), Colorado (Basalt, Centennial, Grand Junction), Florida (Sarasota, Tampa), Illinois (Chicago), Kentucky (Lexington), New Mexico (Albuquerque), New York (Brooklyn, Ithaca), Pennsylvania (Harrisburg), Tennessee (Nashville), Texas (Austin, Houston)
- President/CEO: Douglas Jackson, PhD, JD
- Parent organization: Benevolent Healthcare Foundation
- Website: http://www.projectcure.org

PROJECT C.U.R.E. (Commission on Urgent Relief and Equipment) is the registered trademark of the Benevolent Healthcare Foundation, a 501(c)(3) non-profit, humanitarian relief organization based in Denver, Colorado. It is one of the largest nonprofit organizations in the world that delivers medical supplies and equipment to developing countries. Its main purpose is to collect and sort donated medical supplies and equipment from manufacturers, hospitals, and surpluses and then distribute the supplies and equipment to developing countries based on a needs assessment of the local hospitals and clinics in those countries.

== History ==
The idea of PROJECT C.U.R.E. was created in 1987 by James W. Jackson. During a trip to Brazil, Jackson observed how many of the clinics in rural areas were unable to accommodate many of the patients due to the lack of medical supplies and equipment and the large number of people seeking medical attention. When Jackson returned home to Colorado, he collected about $250,000 worth of medical supplies for a Brazilian clinic. Since 1987, PROJECT C.U.R.E. has expanded and, as of 2017, worked in over 134 countries around the world, including India, Ethiopia, Kenya and Mexico.

In 2005, the Ministry of Health of Belize and PROJECT C.U.R.E. established a partnership to deliver medical supplies and equipment to Belize. In 2010, PROJECT C.U.R.E. partnered with Belize Natural Energy and the Ministry of Health of Belize to ship medical supplies to a hospital in Belmopan.

== Location ==
PROJECT C.U.R.E.'s headquarters and main distribution center is located in Centennial, Colorado. Other distribution centers are located in Phoenix, AZ, Nashville, TN, Houston, TX, Philadelphia, PA and Chicago, IL.

Project C.U.R.E. maintains collection centers in Albuquerque, NM, Austin, TX, Basalt, CO, Brooklyn, NY, Grand Junction, CO, Harrisburg, PA, Ithaca, NY, Lexington, KY, Sarasota, FL, and Tampa, FL.

== Financial Accountability ==
PROJECT C.U.R.E. uses the majority of its funding into the completion of its projects. 98.6% of PROJECT C.U.R.E.'s total annual spending is made up of program expenses. Administrative expenses total 0.7% of the organization's budget and fundraising expenses constitute 0.6% of total annual spending.

== Programs ==
=== ProCURE ===
ProCURE is the name of the project in which PROJECT C.U.R.E. collects new and overstock medical supplies and working equipment from manufacturers, wholesale suppliers, hospitals, clinics and individuals. The goods obtained from ProCURE are then sorted and inventoried at PROJECT C.U.R.E. distribution centers before being sent to hospitals and clinics in developing counties.

=== Corps ===
The C.U.R.E. Corps is the volunteer member group for PROJECT C.U.R.E. made up of individuals, families, civic and church groups. Volunteer tasks include contacting hospitals and doctors for donations, collecting donations, sorting supplies, packing boxes, and loading supplies onto cargo containers to be shipped.

=== Cargo ===
Cargo containers for PROJECT C.U.R.E. are the size of a semi-truck trailer. Each container holds an average of $400,000 in medical supplies and equipment. On average, PROJECT C.U.R.E. delivers two cargo containers a week to developing nations.

=== Kits ===
C.U.R.E. Kits are boxes which contain essential medical supplies and equipment to be carried as luggage on an international flight. C.U.R.E. Kits are designed to meet the needs for short-term medical missions abroad and can be shipped directly to the traveler's home.

=== Clinics ===
C.U.R.E. Clinics prove an avenue for volunteer medical professionals to travel to developing countries where they are able to offer medical services. Location in which PROJECT C.U.R.E. Clinics have operated include: Guatemala, Kenya, Rwanda, Ghana, Bolivia, China, and Togo.

=== Kits for Kids ===
C.U.R.E. Kits for Kids is a program where drawstring backpacks are filled with personal hygiene and basic "medicine cabinet" items that are scarce in the third world. Kits for Kids gives parents the supplies they need to care for their children at home. Each bag has a tag, which allows for tracking as it makes its way across the world and into the hands of a family in need.

== Leadership ==
=== James W. Jackson ===
James W. Jackson is the founder and chairman emeritus of PROJECT C.U.R.E.'s board of directors. He received a Bachelor of Arts in 1963 and completed his Master of Arts in 1964. He completed postgraduate studies in economics and the University of Colorado and received a Doctor of Humanities degree from Colorado Christian University in 1997. Jackson has been awarded the Colorado "Ethics in Business Award," the American Red Cross "Healthcare Lifetime Achievement Award," and Regis University's Civis Princeps Award for his efforts in changing lives around the world.

=== Dr. Douglas Jackson ===
Dr. Douglas Jackson, son of the Founder James W. Jackson, became the Chief Executive Officer and President of PROJECT C.U.R.E. in 1997. Dr. Jackson served as Provost for Colorado Christian University in Lakewood, Colorado and was the Director of the Fermanian Business Center at Point Loma University in San Diego, California before working at C.U.R.E. Douglas Jackson graduated magna cum laude from Northwest Nazarene College in 1982, with a Bachelor of Arts in Business Administration. In 1985, he earned a Juris Doctor from the University of Colorado at Boulder. After becoming an attorney, Douglas directed the legal affairs for the international agricultural firm, Chore-Time/Brock (CTB), Inc. in Milford, Indiana. In 1992, he earned a Ph.D. in Business Administration from the University of Colorado at Boulder. He has also served as a director for such organizations as: HOPE International, Christian Executive Officers, YMCA, and the Leadership Denver Association.
