= Miodrag Lazić =

Serbian surgeon and writer (1955–2020)

- Born: 31 May 1955; Zemun, FPR Yugoslavia
- Died: 14 April 2020 (aged 64); Niš, Serbia
- Education: University of Belgrade Faculty of Medicine
- Occupation: Surgeon
- Known for: Being a war surgeon during Croatian and Bosnian War

Miodrag Lazić (Serbian Cyrillic: Миодраг Лазић; 31 May 1955 – 14 April 2020) was a Serbian surgeon and writer best known for being a volunteer war surgeon for the Serbian Army of Krajina during the Croatian War and Army of Republika Srpska during the Bosnian War. Pavle, Serbian Patriarch awarded him the Order of Saint Sava for his war efforts. During this period, he wrote the autobiographical work "Diary of a War Surgeon (Knin 1991 - Serbian Sarajevo 1995)".

He died on 14 April 2020, in Niš due to complications caused by COVID-19 infection.
