= Irinej, Serbian Patriarch =

Patriarch of the Serbian Orthodox Church from 2010 to 2020

His Holiness Irinej
- Archbishop of Peć, Metropolitan of Belgrade and Karlovci, and Serbian Patriarch
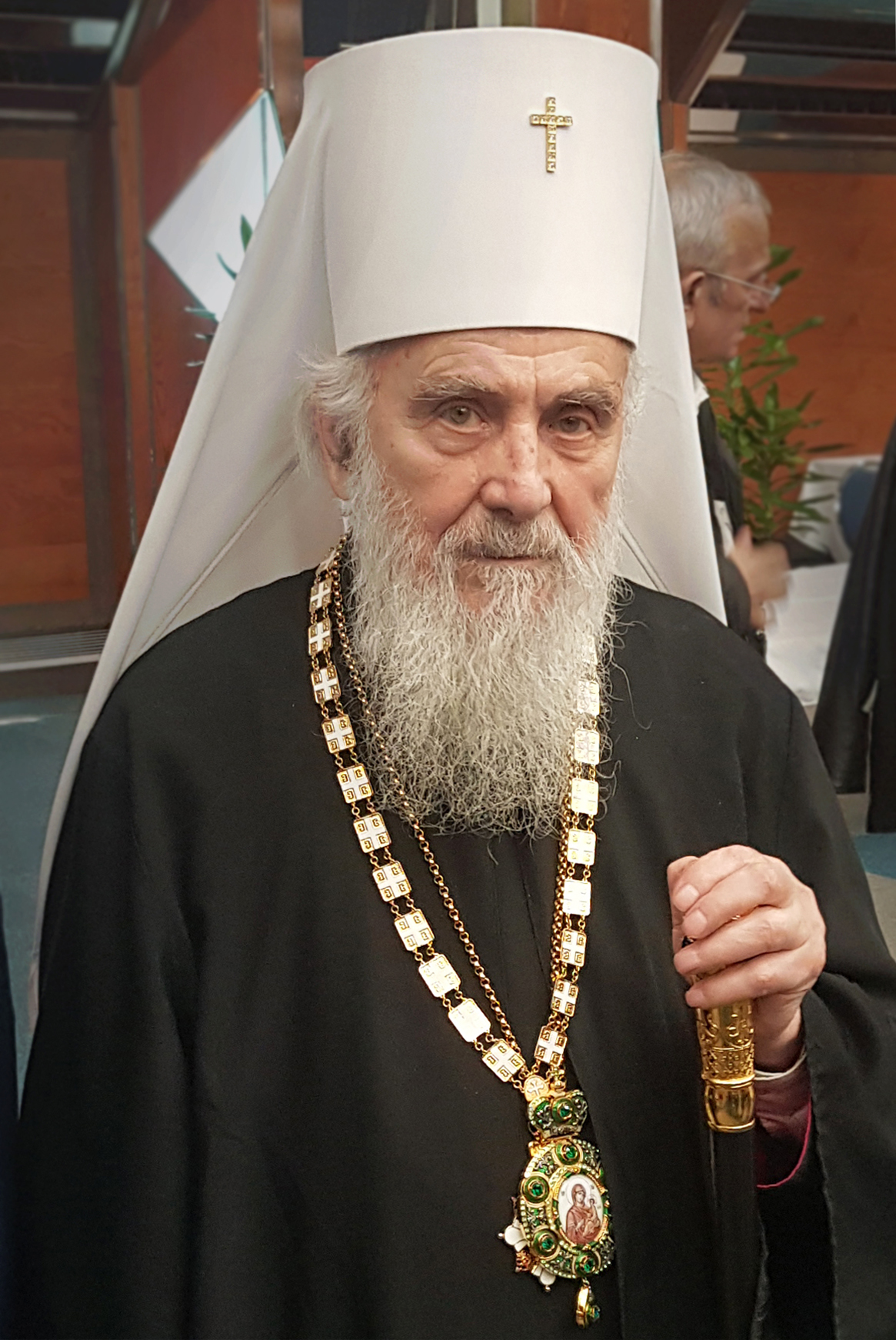
- Patriarch Irinej in 2019
- Church: Serbian Orthodox Church
- See: Belgrade
- Installed: 23 January 2010
- Term ended: 20 November 2020
- Predecessor: Pavle
- Successor: Porfirije

Orders
- Ordination: 24 October 1959
- Consecration: 1 May 1974

Personal details
- Born: 28 August 1930 Vidova, Kingdom of Yugoslavia
- Died: 20 November 2020 (aged 90) Belgrade, Serbia
- Buried: Church of Saint Sava, Belgrade
- Denomination: Eastern Orthodoxy

Styles of Serbian Patriarch Irinej
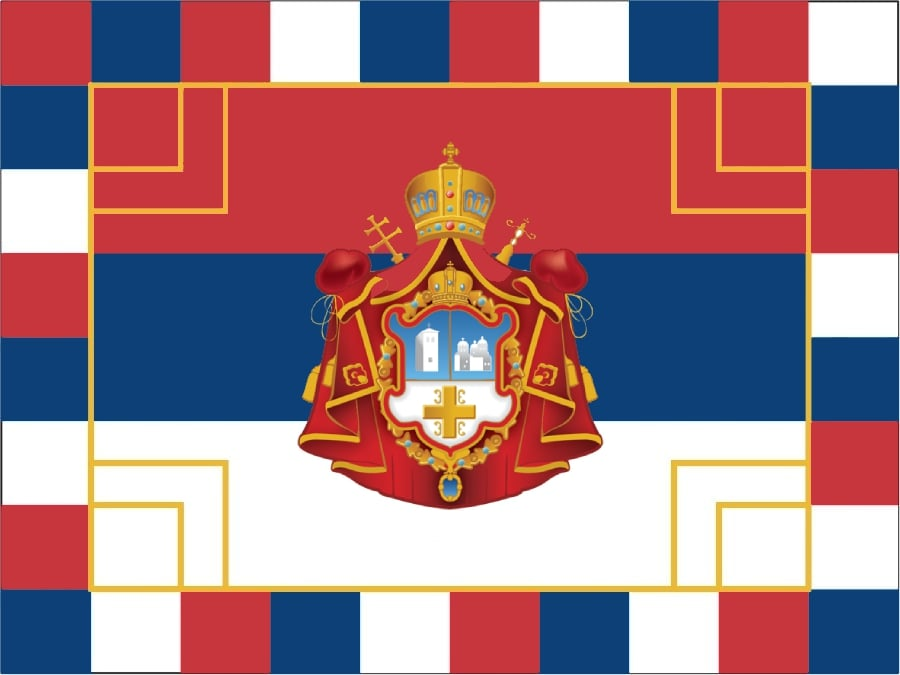
- Reference style: His Holiness
- Spoken style: Your Holiness
- Religious style: Patriarch
- Posthumous style: His Holiness Patriarch Irinej of Blessed Repose

Irinej (Serbian: Иринеј, English: Irenaeus; born Miroslav Gavrilović; 28 August 1930 – 20 November 2020) was the 45th Patriarch of the Serbian Orthodox Church, serving from 2010 until his death in 2020.

== Early life ==
Irinej was born as Miroslav Gavrilović on 28 August 1930 in the village of Vidova near Čačak, Kingdom of Yugoslavia (present-day Serbia). After graduating from high school, he enrolled and completed the Prizren Seminary. He then enrolled at the University of Belgrade's Theological Faculty and served in the army after graduating. After compulsory military service, he was tonsured a monk in 1959 at the Rakovica Monastery, receiving the monastic name of "Irinej" (from Ancient Greek: Εἰρηναῖος, Ancient Greek: [eːrɛːˈnâi̯os]; Irenaeus). He was a professor at the Prizren Seminary, and completed postgraduate studies in Athens. In 1969, he was appointed a head of the monastic school at Ostrog Monastery. In 1969, he returned to Prizren, where he was appointed Rector of the Prizren Seminary. When the Prizren Seminary was displaced from Prizren due to Kosovo War in 1999, he as then bishop of Niš made it possible that a new building of the Seminary was built in Niš, where the Seminary continued its work.

== Titular Bishop of Moravica ==
Irinej was elected titular bishop of Moravica in May 1974. As the bishop of Moravica, he was a vicar to the Serbian Patriarch, at the time German. After one year, he left the position following his election for the bishop of Niš.

== Bishop of Niš ==
In May 1975, Irinej was elected bishop of Niš and enthroned in the Holy Trinity Cathedral on 15 June 1975 in Niš. Bishop Irinej was elected to the Holy Synod of the Serbian Orthodox Church in May 2009. Irinej headed the Eparchy of Niš for 35 years.

== Serbian Patriarch ==
Irinej was elected Serbian Patriarch on 22 January 2010, two months after the death of previous patriarch, Pavle, becoming the 45th Serbian Patriarch. He was one of the three candidates with the most votes at the Electoral Council, along with former locum tenens (interim leader) Metropolitan Amfilohije Radović of Montenegro and the Littoral and Bishop Irinej Bulović of Bačka. In the final phase, his name was pulled from a sealed envelope. In this way, the Serbian Orthodox Church believes the patriarch is elected by divine intervention, sidelining human interests.

Irinej was enthroned on 23 January 2010 in Cathedral of Saint Archangel Michael in Belgrade. The inauguration was attended by numerous government ministers of Serbia, representatives of churches and religious communities in Serbia, and various politicians including the Prime Minister Mirko Cvetković, Prime Minister of Republika Srpska Milorad Dodik, Apostolic Nuncio Orlando Antonini, Catholic archbishop of Belgrade Stanislav Hočevar, Serbian Mufti Muhamed Jusufspahić, and Crown Prince Alexander.

Irinej held his formal enthronement to the ancient throne of the Serbian patriarchs at the Patriarchate of Peć Monastery on 3 October 2010. The enthronement was attended by many dignitaries including Serbian president Boris Tadić, Croatian Parliament member Milorad Pupovac, Russian Metropolitan Hilarion Alfeyev, Jerusalem Archbishop Theophylactos of Iordanos, Georgian Metropolitan Gerasimos of Zugdidi and Tsaishi, Romanian Metropolitan Irineu, Bulgarian Metropolitan Domentian of Vidin, Cypriot Metropolitan Chrysostomos, Albanian Metropolitan Ignatios of Berat, Archbishop Hočevar, Mufti Jusufspahić, Crown Prince Alexander and princes Peter, Philip, and Alexander.

Irinej was considered, both abroad and at home, as a moderate traditionalist, open to global inter-religious dialogue.

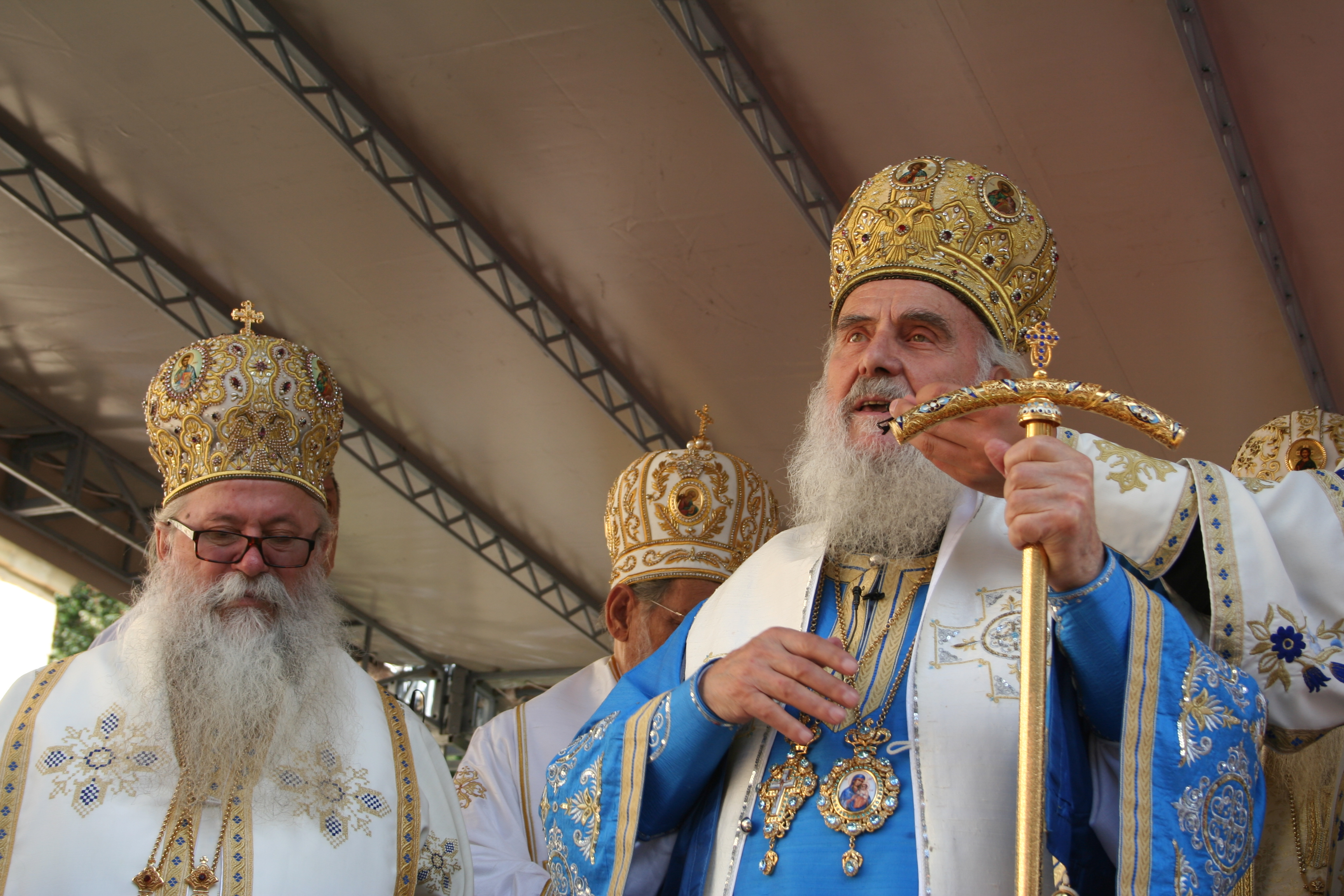
Irinej on the 700th anniversary of the Tronoša Monastery, 2017

After the Hagia Sophia was converted to a mosque in July 2020, the Patriarch Irinej and the president of Serbia, Aleksandar Vučić on 20 August 2020 expressed their wish, that the Church of Saint Sava in Belgrade might indirectly replace the Hagia Sophia after which it was modelled, and become a ″New Hagia Sophia″.

During last three years of the Patriarch Irinej's tenure, the Serbian Government spent 43 million euro on completing the construction of the church. Also, Naftna Industrija Srbije donated 10.5 million euros.

Irinej has been criticized for his lack of action in regards to allegations of pedophilia within the Serbian Orthodox Church, which were reported in the summer of 2012 and affected public opinion in Serbia and in Bosnia and Herzegovina. The scandal, initially covered up, led to the resignation of the bishop of Zvornik and Tuzla, Vasilije Kačavenda, who was accused of having abused children for decades. A court in London ruled that the Serbian Orthodox Church was not guilty for the six reported cases of alleged pedophilia in the lawsuit filed by a group of citizens. The suit was rejected and the group had to pay 160,000£ to the Serbian Orthodox Church.

=== Stances ===
==== Pope's visit to Serbia ====
In 2010, Irinej indicated he would not oppose the first-ever visit by the pope of the Catholic Church to Serbia in 2013 as part of celebrations of the 1,700th anniversary of the Edict of Milan, the law under which Roman emperor Constantine I, who was born in Niš, ended the persecution of Christians. Irinej said that "there is the wish of the Pope" for a meeting in Niš and that it would be a chance "not just for a meeting, but for a dialogue". The visit of the Pope did not take place, as Irinej's Orthodox Church insisted on a papal apology for crimes committed against Serbian Orthodox during World War II. ”An apology would be a gesture that instills hope that something like that will never happen again," said Irinej.

A visit by Pope Francis (deemed politically useful for Serbia's battle against the international recognition of Kosovo) was discussed again for May 2016, but Serbian president Tomislav Nikolić called it off after hearing the negative opinion of Irinej's Orthodox Church. In July 2018, Irinej confirmed that it was still not the right moment for a visit of the Pope to Serbia, "because of everything that has happened in the past, and a huge number of [Serb] refugees from Croatia, a large portion of the nation is against it."

It is therefore obvious that this is not so much about a visit by a religious leader as it is about a lack of will for dialogue between state, national and religious communities. With real or invented accusations against the other side, it is not possible to even start any conversation, and thus many issues remain more complicated than the Gordian knot. Namely, the Croatian-Catholic side can also come up with similar reasons (similar to the Bosniak-Muslim side), which mentions the Serbian genocide against Croats in Bosnia and Herzegovina in the years from 1991 to 1995. Among other things, they cite the information that of the pre-war 760,000 Croats in the territory of Bosnia and Herzegovina, probably only 400,000 remained, which is a direct consequence of "ethnic cleansing".

==== Islamic community ====
On 28 January 2010, at his first news conference, Irinej stated that:

Patrijarh Irinej o islamu

"Mi znamo šta je otprilike filozofija i psihologija islama. Oni kada su u manjem broju umiju da se ponašaju i da budu korektni. Kada postanu ravni po broju, onda oni već dižu glavu, a kada postanu nadmoćni i superiorni, čine pritisak ili da se isele ili da se priđe njima."

Patriarch Irenaeus about Islam

"We know roughly what the philosophy and psychology of Islam is. When they are outnumbered, they know how to behave and be correct. When they become equal in number, then they raise their heads, and when they become overwhelming and superior, they put pressure either to move out or to be approached."

The Islamic Community in Serbia said that it found the remarks to be "insulting Islam" and responded with a letter to the Serbian Orthodox Church requesting an official interpretation of his statement. This Community condemned what they called "insulting and false accusations".The Muslim community in Serbia has expressed its concern over the hate speech of the newly elected patriarch; it should be condemned all the more since it has only been 15 years since the genocide against Muslims in Srebrenica and elsewhere:

“It is completely clear that this statement calls for genocide, because it undoubtedly shows that Muslims are acceptable to the patriarch only when they are in minority and when they live with their heads bowed down.”

On 29 January, he expressed regrets for his statement and its consequences, and to Muslims, as neighbours and brothers he extended apologies. Hereupon his apologies were accepted.

==== Canonization of Aloysius Stepinac ====
In May 2019, Pope Francis stated that Irinej had helped in the reflection in the Catholic Church about the canonization of World War II Croatian Cardinal Aloysius Stepinac, which the Serbian Orthodox Church opposes due to his role in the Nazi-allied Independent State of Croatia. "I sought advice and I saw that I need to seek help from Irinej. He is a great patriarch. Irinej helped, we created a joint historic commission, and we cooperated," said the Pope. "The truth is both mine and Irinej's only interest."

==== Abortion ====
Irinej was firmly against abortion. In 2017, he stated in a local newspaper that it is "a woman's duty to give birth in order to regenerate the nation". In 2019 he condemned a performance by women's rights activists, which placed an apron saying 'Abortion is a Woman's Right' on a monument to his predecessor Patriarch Pavle in Belgrade. "Doing something like this is shameful, whatever the reason. It’s not nice," he said, recalling that the Church and Patriarch Pavle were opposed to abortion.

==== LGBTQ ====
Irinej was openly against of the freedom of expression of the LGBTQ community in Serbia. In 2011, Irinej labelled the planned pride parade in Belgrade a "pestilence" and a "parade of shame".

In October 2012, Irinej wrote to Prime Minister of Serbia Ivica Dačić to express concern over the moral image of Belgrade and Serbia, "our centuries-long Christian culture and the dignity of our family, as the foundation block of humankind". "I am writing to you all on behalf of the Serbian Orthodox Church and its followers ... Authorities must take immediate action to bring this scandal to a halt".

In 2014, in an interview for Nedeljnik, he stated: "I feel sorry for those people who belong to the so-called gay community. It is a disorder or deviation of human nature. I can understand them, as well as their problem, but I cannot understand what they impose on us and what they show in public." He denounced Belgrade Pride as "immoral" and "imposed by the homosexual lobby and their mentors from Western Europe".

In 2017, when Ana Brnabić was appointed the Serbian prime minister, the first openly gay person to serve in the office, Irinej did not openly criticise the choice of Serbian President Aleksandar Vučić: "The Serbian Orthodox Church does not peek through other people’s windows and does not deal with the private lives of state officials," a press release stated. "It is extremely irresponsible to present scandalous details or someone’s personal temptations to the media and thus expose people to potential danger. The Church never condemns. It condemns only sin, only evil, and pities man."

==== Domestic politics ====
Irinej and the Serbian Orthodox Church were considered very close to the political leadership of Serbia under Serbian Progressive Party and Aleksandar Vučić, in power since 2012. Vučić was awarded the highest decoration of the Church, the Order of Saint Sava, in October 2020. The year before, Irinej criticized the anti-government protests, stating that "what we see in streets today is not good" and that, "it gives strength to our enemies". Irinej and the Serbian Orthodox Church were also considered opposed to any deal with Kosovo under the EU-facilitated normalisation dialogue.

In January 2013, Irinej openly advocated for the restoration of the Serbian monarchy, after the liturgy commemorating the transfer of the remains of King Peter II to Serbia from the United States.

==== Kosovo ====
On 4 October 2010, Patriarch Irinej said that international recognition of Kosovo was a "sin". Speaking about the Orthodox monasteries in Kosovo, Irinej said in 2015 that "if force is deployed" to deprive Serbia of its cultural and historical heritage, "we will do all we can to defend them, by peaceful means or by force."

In 2018, in multiple occasions Irinej publicly supported President Vučić, stating that he was "fighting like a lion" to maintain Kosovo as a part of Serbia. The same year, Irinej suggested that the Serbian Orthodox Church could rename itself as the Serbian Orthodox Church – Patriarchate of Peć, to highlight its links with Kosovo, in a move that was interpreted as in opposition to the government's participation in the EU-facilitated normalisation dialogue with Kosovo.

==== Bosnia and Herzegovina ====
On 10 November 2010, Irinej stated in an interview that "the Drina River [between Serbia and Bosnia and Herzegovina] is not a border but a bridge that connects us. Although, in a way, we are one even today, God willing, we will soon really be one." Irinej elaborated that for now "it is enough that we are one as a nation, as the Orthodox Church, and that we are on the same path of Saint Sava and Christ." He praised the Serbs of Banja Luka stating that "[they fight] to preserve the Serb name. Although this is not at all an easy task, they are succeeding."

In January 2012, Irinej referred to Republika Srpska, one of two entities comprising Bosnia and Herzegovina, as "the youngest Serbian state". The Office of the High Representative responded and stated that the Republika Srpska is not a state but rather an entity within Bosnia and Herzegovina. The OHR noted that Bosnia and Herzegovina's Constitution "left no room for any kind of the entity’s sovereignty" and that "the entity’s jurisdiction was not an indication of any sort of statehood."

In November 2017, he called the life sentence handed out by the Hague Tribunal to former Army of Republika Srpska General Ratko Mladić for, inter alia, the Srebrenica genocide "a work of the devil". He deemed the sentence as part of a global conspiracy against the Serbs. "One more Serb has been convicted in The Hague. We knew Ratko Mladić would be convicted and that everything would play out this way. Unfortunately, we can't do anything about it," said the Patriarch. "This is all happening because the many global wielders of power are doing the devil's work and we are suffering the consequences."

Irinej often attended Serbian Orthodox Church and public events of the Bosnian Serb leadership. On 9 January 2019, he attended the Republika Srpska's Statehood Day parade in Banja Luka, together with Serbian prime minister Ana Brnabić. The Statehod Day celebration had been found unconstitutional by the Constitutional Court of Bosnia and Herzegovina in 2015.

==== European Union ====
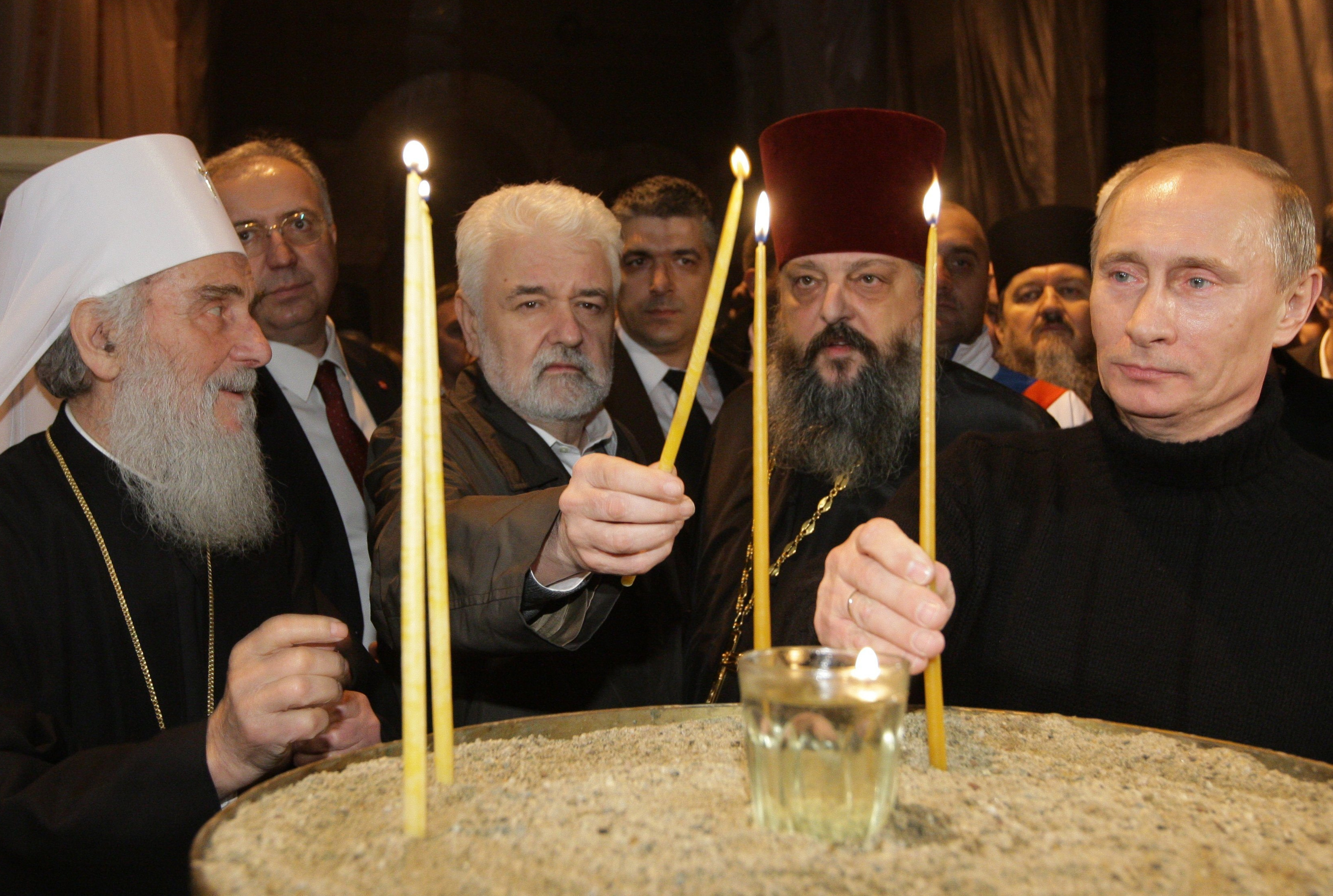
Irinej with Vladimir Putin, President of Russia, in the Church of Saint Sava, 2011

Regarding the possible accession of Serbia to the European Union, Irinej said that: "Serbia should not look with suspicion at the EU, if the EU respects the Serbian identity, culture and religion. We believe that we are an historical part of Europe, and we want to be in this comity of nations. In the accession we will accept everything, that is not in contradiction with our cultural and historical identity."

In 2018, Irinej claimed that the European Union is not actually "very eager" to accept Serbia as a new member state "because of our friendship with Russia, and [the EU's] internal reasons of theirs; they keep making new preconditions all the time and demand from us to accept their solution over Kosovo and Metohija."

==== Syria ====
In June 2019, Irinej visited Syrian president Bashar al-Assad in Syria. In an official statement, Patriarch Irinej "highly praised the principled and firm support" of the Assad regime in backing Serbia with regard to Kosovo.

=== Death and funeral ===
On 4 November 2020, Irinej tested positive for COVID-19 after attending, as well as presiding over, the 1 November funeral of Metropolitan Amfilohije, who also tested positive and had died from COVID-19. The large crowds at Amfilohije's funeral did not practise social distancing or wear masks and Amfilohije's casket was open during the service. On 14 November, it was reported that his health condition was "stable and under control during hospitalization" in the military COVID hospital in Belgrade. On 19 November, he was intubated. Some media outlets reported that Irinej had died; the Serbian Orthodox Church issued a statement refuting these claims, but said that Irinej was in worsening health at a military hospital in Belgrade. Some members of the press still insisted that the news of Irinej's death had been confirmed by reputable sources.

Irinej's death was officially announced on 20 November at 7:07 am CET. On the same day, the Government of Serbia, as well as Republika Srpska, declared three-day mourning following his death, while the town of Budva, Montenegro, declared a day of mourning on 23 November, a day after Irinej's funeral. French president Emmanuel Macron expressed his condolences in the Serbian Cyrillic script. Russian president Vladimir Putin sent his condolences, as did the head of the Orthodox Church of Ukraine, Epiphanius of Kyiv, and the deputy of the Department for External Church Relations of the Russian Orthodox Church, Archpriest Nikolay Balashov. The European Commissioner for Neighbourhood and Enlargement Olivér Várhelyi tweeted his condolences to Serbia's people. Patriarch John X of Antioch and All the East, sent a message of condolence to the Holy Synod of the Serbian Orthodox Church, as well as Patriarch Theodore II of Alexandria. Pope Francis stated that Irinej was "an example of faith and dialogue".

The Interparliamentary Assembly on Orthodoxy stated that "The late Primate [Irinej], during his Patriarchal service, reflected the profound Orthodox feelings of the Serbian people, as well as his hope for a better future. Until today, he strived, without sparing any effort, for the unity of the One and Indivisible Church of Christ and the troubles that concern the modern world." The Pontifical Council for Promoting Christian Unity stated that "throughout his ministry, His Holiness [Irinej] remained an example of faith and dialogue, humble and joyful, totally dedicating his life to God and fostering the spirit of communion within the Serbian Orthodox Church." Many other organizations sent their messages of condolence, including Appeal of Conscience Foundation and German Bishops' Conference.

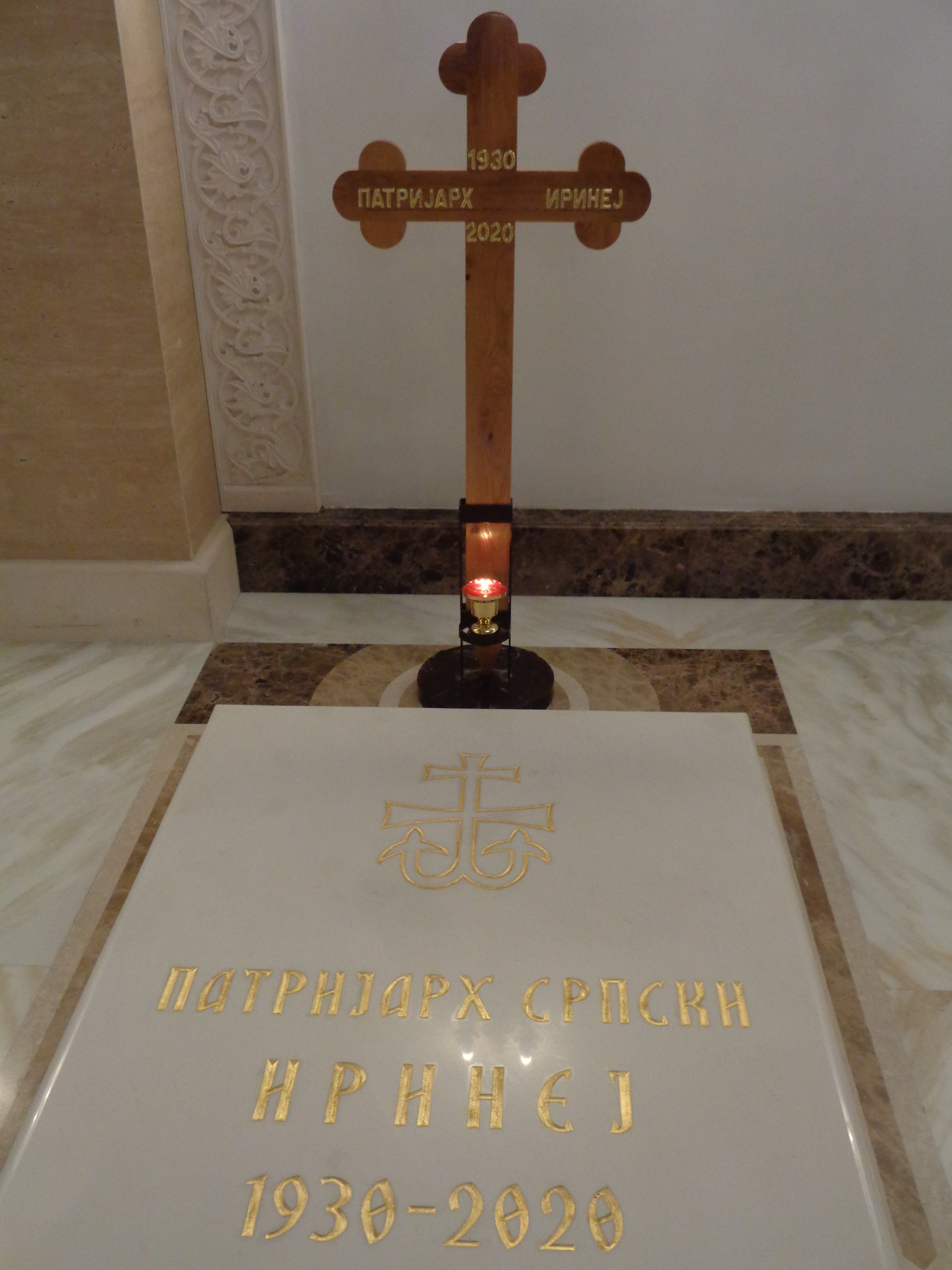
Tomb in the crypt of Church of Saint Sava

On 21 November, Irinej's body was brought to the Cathedral of Saint Archangel Michael where was held the Divine Liturgy on the feast day of the cathedral and the second-largest slava celebrated in Serbia. Following the ceremony, his body was carried to the Church of Saint Sava, and thousands of mourners passed by the coffin which, in consideration of coronavirus and the circumstances of the Patriarch’s death, had a glass lid. On the same date, Metropolitan Hilarion Alfeyev of Volokolamsk, the chairman of the Department for External Church Relations of the Moscow Patriarchate and the chief delegate of the Russian Orthodox Church delegation, arrived in Belgrade for Irinej's funeral.

His funeral was held on 22 November at the Church of Saint Sava. After the Holy Liturgy, speeches were given by Protoiereus-Staurophore Petar Lukić, Bishop Irinej of Bačka, Serbian president Aleksandar Vučić, and Chairman of the Presidency of Bosnia and Herzegovina Milorad Dodik. In his speech, President Vučić said that love was the basis of the faith of the late patriarch, and his Serbia was the one he created himself - a Serbia of peace, a Serbia that understands and brings people together. Irinej is the first Serbian Patriarch to be buried in the crypt of the Church.

Funeral service was also attended by numerous government ministers of Serbia and various politicians from the Balkans including the Prime Minister-designate of Montenegro Zdravko Krivokapić and President of Republika Srpska Željka Cvijanović, and dignitaries such as Prince Filip Karađorđević and Stanislav Hočevar, the Catholic archbishop of Belgrade.

Bishop David of Kruševac who led Irinej's funeral service tested positive for COVID-19 following the funeral. At the time, Bishop David is one of the four remaining members of the Holy Synod of the Serbian Orthodox Church.

== Awards and honours ==
- Grand Collar of the Order of the Eagle of Georgia, Bagrationi dynasty, 2011
- Order of the Republika Srpska, Republika Srpska, 2011
- Grand Cross of the Order of Karađorđe's Star, Karađorđević dynasty, 2013
- Order of White Angel In Mileševa Monastery On October 7, 2011, during the consecration of the largest bell in Serbia, the Order of the Eparchy of Mileševa was awarded to Patriarch Irinej and other personalities and institutions.
- Order of Saint Nikolaj, Eparchy of Šabac
- Saint Vladimir's Orthodox Theological Seminary, honorary degree
- Honorary citizen of Zemun

== See also ==
- List of heads of the Serbian Orthodox Church
- List of 21st-century religious leaders

Eastern Orthodox Church titles
Preceded by Lavrentije Trifunović	Titular bishop of Moravica; 1974–1975	Succeeded by Jefrem Milutinović
Preceded by Jovan Ilić	Bishop of Niš; 1975–2010	Succeeded by Jovan Purić
Preceded by Pavle	Serbian Patriarch; 2010–2020	Succeeded by Porfirije
