= Miloš Šobajić =

Serbian and French painter and sculptor (1945–2021)

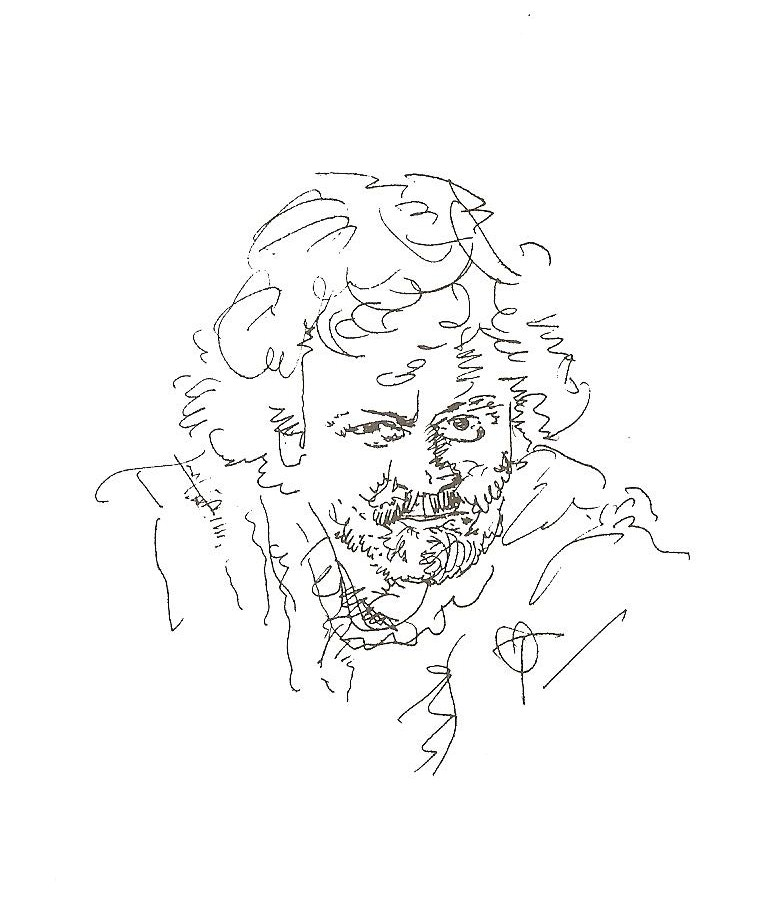
- by Dejan Stojanović.
- Born: 23 December 1945; Belgrade, Serbia, Yugoslavia
- Died: 24 April 2021 (aged 75); Belgrade, Serbia
- Education: Academy of Fine Arts in Belgrade
- Known for: painting, sculpting
- Spouses: Lotos Masnikosa Šobajić (m. 1968; died 2011) Dragana Jugović del Monaco (m. 2012; div. 2015) Maja T. Izquierdo (m. 2016)

Miloš Šobajić (Serbian Cyrillic: Милош Шобајић, French: Milos SobaÏc; 23 December 1945 – 24 April 2021) was a Serbian and French painter and sculptor.

== Biography ==
Šobajić (French: Sobaîc) was born in 1945 in Belgrade. According to his father Vojo, he came from a Serbian family from Montenegro, which at the end of the 19th century brought to Montenegro the first cinema, the first department store, the first theater, a reading room and a library, a tin orchestra, the first newspapers and magazines. His mother Mira came from Lika.

Šobajić attended primary and secondary school in Belgrade, Istanbul and Nikšić. He graduated from the First Belgrade Gymnasium in 1964. He graduated from the Academy of Fine Arts in Belgrade in 1970, and two years later moved to Paris. Since 2005, he had been teaching at the Luxun Academy of Fine Arts in Shenyang, China, and at the same time founded the Faculty of Art and Design at Megatrend University in Belgrade, where he was dean, full professor and honorary doctor, and in 2012, he became professor emeritus.

Šobajić has presented his works in over eighty solo exhibitions around the planet and participated in about five hundred group exhibitions. His works are in about thirty museums of contemporary art in the world. He has won several awards in Serbia. In 2018, the Russian State Duma awarded him the Order of the Honorary Guest of Russia, and in 2019 he was awarded the Gold Medal of the Republic of Serbia, for exceptional merits in the field of cultural activities, especially painting.

Five monographs on the work of Šobajić have been published by publishers in Paris, Belgrade and London, whose texts were written by Alain Jouffroy, Nobel laureate Peter Handke, Edward Lucie-Smith and others. Over six hundred texts about him have been published in the domestic and world press and through television shows.

Šobajić published his first book, entitled: Paint and be silent, of an autobiographical character, which talks about the influence of globalism on contemporary art, in 2018. The city of Belgrade anticipates the opening of the Miloš Šobajić Museum in 2021. In 2021, he published his autobiography "My Nine Lives".

Šobajić was married to his third wife Maja T. Izquierdo (Serbian Cyrillic: Искјердо) of Peruvian and Serbian origin. He died in Belgrade of COVID-19 on 24 April 2021.
