= Princess Josephine of Denmark =

Danish princess (born 2011)

Princess Josephine
- Countess of Monpezat
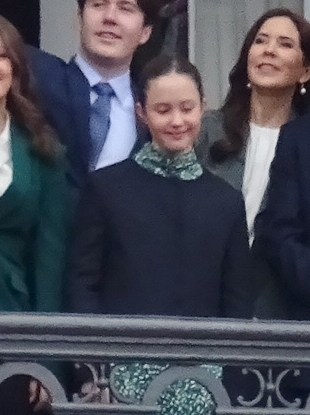
- Josephine in 2023
- Born: 8 January 2011 (age 15); Rigshospitalet, Copenhagen, Denmark
Names
- Josephine Sophia Ivalo Mathilda
- Father: Frederik X
- Mother: Mary Donaldson

Princess Josephine of Denmark, Countess of Monpezat RE (Josephine Sophia Ivalo Mathilda; born 8 January 2011) is a member of the Danish royal family. She is the fourth and youngest child of King Frederik X and Queen Mary, and the seventh grandchild of Queen Margrethe II and Prince Henrik. She is the twin sister of Prince Vincent. Josephine is fourth in line to the Danish throne, after her older siblings, Crown Prince Christian and Princess Isabella, and her elder twin brother, Prince Vincent.

== Birth and christening ==
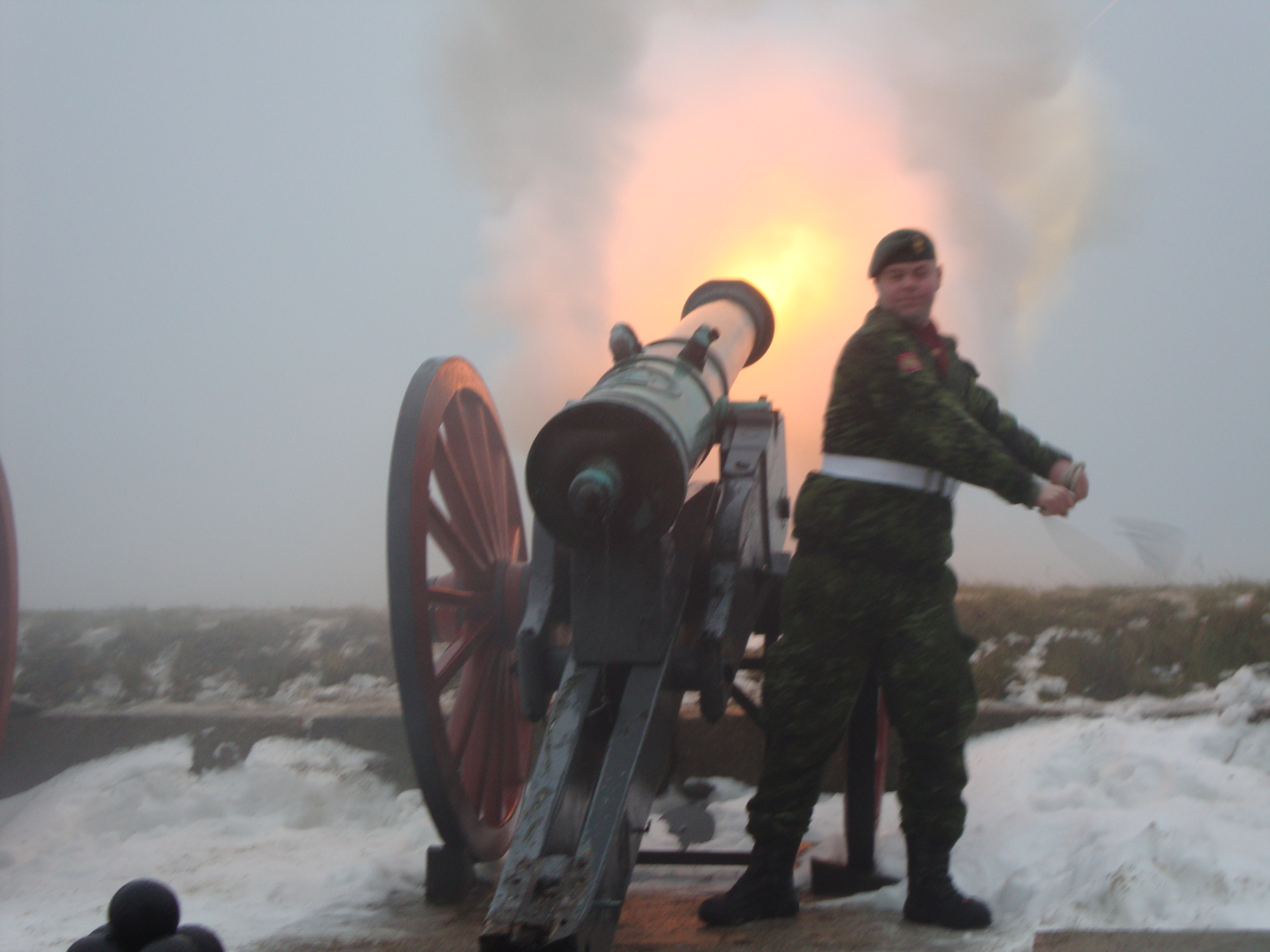
21-gun salute from Kronborg Castle at the occasion of the birth of Prince Vincent and Princess Josephine on 8 January 2011

Josephine was born on 8 January 2011 at Rigshospitalet, the Copenhagen University Hospital, in Copenhagen, at 10:56 am local time, 26 minutes after her twin brother. At noon on 8 January, a 21-gun salute was fired from the Sixtus Battery at Holmen Naval Base in the Port of Copenhagen and from Kronborg Castle in Elsinore in North Zealand to mark the arrival of the two royal children.

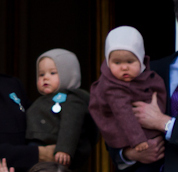
Prince Vincent and Princess Josephine in January 2012

Josephine and Vincent were baptised on 14 April at the Church of Holmen in central Copenhagen by the royal confessor, the Bishop of Copenhagen Erik Norman Svendsen. The twins were baptised at the royal baptismal font which has been used for the baptism of royal children in Denmark since 1671. Princess Josephine wore a christening gown found among her great-grandmother Queen Ingrid's belongings, making her the first child of a future Danish monarch not to wear the Danish royal family's traditional christening gown (which was worn by her twin brother) since it was taken into use in 1870. The Princess's name was announced as Josephine Sophia Ivalo Mathilda. Her third name, Ivalo, is Greenlandic. It stems from the Qaanaaq region where her father patrolled with the Sirius Dog Sled Patrol and means "sinew". Her godparents are her paternal aunt, Princess Marie of Denmark; her maternal aunt, Patricia Bailey; as well as her parents' friends Prince Carlo, Duke of Castro, Count Bendt Wedell, Birgitte Handwerk and Josephine Rechner.

== Public appearances and education ==
On 3 August 2014, during the family's official visit to Greenland, Josephine, her parents and siblings, took part in a tree planting in Qaqortoq's new poplar grove, Ivalos og Miniks Poppellund, named after Josephine and her brother who are known by their Greenlandic middle names in Greenland.

On 15 August 2017, Josephine and her twin brother started school at Tranegårdsskolen in Gentofte – the same public school as her older siblings. In August 2023, the Royal House announced that Josephine would be starting at Kildegård Privatskole in Hellerup in September 2023. The school was founded by Countess Thusnelda Moltke in 1870. Both Josephine and her twin brother were confirmed on 18 April 2026.

== Titles, styles, and honours ==
Royal Monogram of Princess Josephine of Denmark

Josephine is styled as Her Royal Highness Princess Josephine of Denmark, Countess of Monpezat.

=== Honours ===
==== National honours ====
===== Orders and appointments =====
- Knight of the Order of the Elephant (14 January 2024) (R.E.)

===== Medals and decorations =====
- Queen Margrethe II's Ruby Jubilee Medal (14 January 2012)
- Queen Margrethe II's 75th Birthday Medal (16 April 2015)
- Queen Margrethe II and Prince Henrik Queen Margrethe II and Prince Henrik's Golden Wedding Anniversary Medal (10 June 2017)
- Prince Henrik's Memorial Medal (11 June 2018)
- Queen Margrethe II's 80th Birthday Medal (16 April 2020)
- Queen Margrethe II's Golden Jubilee Medal (14 January 2022)

Princess Josephine of Denmark Born: 8 January 2011
Lines of succession
Preceded by Prince Vincent of Denmark	Succession to the Danish throne 4th position	Succeeded by Prince Joachim of Denmark
