= Count of Monpezat =

Danish title of nobility

Coat of arms of King Frederick X of Denmark

Coat of arms of Prince Joachim of Denmark (note the inescutcheon's Monpezat's arms per pale)

Count of Monpezat (Danish: Greve af Monpezat), or Countess of Monpezat (Danish: Komtesse af Monpezat) when the holder is female, is a hereditary title of Danish nobility. It was granted on 30 April 2008 by Queen Margrethe II to her two sons, Crown Prince Frederik (the future king Frederik X) and Prince Joachim, and their legitimate patrilineal (male-line) descendants. The title is derived from the French title of "comte de Laborde de Monpezat", which was used by Frederik and Joachim's father, Prince Henrik. His family started using this title as a title of pretense in republican France in the late 19th century.

The title can only be passed down the male line, but unmarried daughters of a count hold the courtesy title komtesse (derived from the French word for countess). The wife of a count holds the courtesy title grevinde (the Danish word for countess). A komtesse (a count's daughter) cannot pass on the title to her husband or children.

== History ==
=== Origins as a French title ===
Members of the Laborde de Monpezat family have styled themselves as "comte de Laborde de Monpezat" (English: Count of Laborde of Monpezat) since sometime late in the nineteenth century. The right to the use of that comital title is disputed; The Encyclopédie de la fausse noblesse et de la noblesse d'apparence (English: Encyclopedia of False and Apparent Nobility) states that Prince Henrik's ancestor, Jean Laborde, received royal letters patent of ennoblement in 1655, conditional on his reception as a noble in the Estates of the province of Béarn, where his lands were located. However, this condition was never fulfilled, as the Estates refused Laborde's petitions in 1703 and again in 1707. The family's surname was "Monpezat" by the time of the French Revolution, without title, until 14 July 1860, when it was changed by imperial decree to "de Laborde-Monpezat", and legally changed again on 19 May 1861 to "de Laborde de Monpezat".

Although the comital title has been used by the family as if it were a courtesy title, traditionally the royal court and French society accepted such titles when used by genuinely noble families. Before his marriage with queen Margrethe II of Denmark, Prince Henrik also used this French comital title.

=== Danish title ===
In 2008, the title of "Count of Monpezat" (Greve af Monpezat) was conferred by the Queen on her and Prince Henrik's two sons, this as a genuine Danish title of nobility and being hereditary to all legitimate descendants in the male line. According to historian Jon Bloch Skipper, the title granted in 2008 was unrelated to the original French noble title, but was a reference to Prince Henrik and his French lineage.

On 28 September 2022, the Royal Household announced that from 1 January 2023, the children of Prince Joachim will no longer be titled Prince or Princess of Denmark, though their place in the line of succession will be unaffected. This would leave Count or Countess of Monpezat as their most senior titles. The children will also lose the style of Highness, and they will instead be styled as Excellency. Queen Margrethe II said that this would enable her grandchildren to "shape their own lives to a much greater extent without being limited by the special considerations and duties that a formal affiliation with the Royal House of Denmark as an institution involves."

== List of counts of Monpezat ==
The family tree is based on the current line of succession to the Danish throne.

- Queen Margrethe II of Denmark, Countess of Monpezat (b.1940) ∞ Prince Consort Henrik of Denmark, Count of Monpezat (1934–2018)
  - King Frederik X of Denmark, Count of Monpezat (b.1968) ∞ Queen Consort Mary of Denmark, Countess of Monpezat (b.1972)
    - (1) Crown Prince Christian of Denmark, Count of Monpezat (b. 2005)
    - (2) Princess Isabella of Denmark, Countess of Monpezat (b. 2007)
    - (3) Prince Vincent of Denmark, Count of Monpezat (b. 2011)
    - (4) Princess Josephine of Denmark, Countess of Monpezat (b. 2011)
  - (5) Prince Joachim of Denmark, Count of Monpezat (b. 1969)
    - (6) Count Nikolai of Monpezat (b. 1999)
    - (7) Count Felix of Monpezat (b. 2002)
    - (8) Count Henrik of Monpezat (b. 2009)
    - (9) Countess Athena of Monpezat (b. 2012)

== See also ==
- House of Monpezat
- Danish nobility
- Mountbatten-Windsor
