= Isabella of Denmark =

Isabella of Denmark may refer to:

- Isabella of Austria (1501–1526), wife of Christian II of Denmark
- Princess Isabella of Denmark (b. 2007), daughter of Frederik, Crown Prince of Denmark
