= Prince Vincent of Denmark =

Danish prince (born 2011)

Prince Vincent
- Count of Monpezat
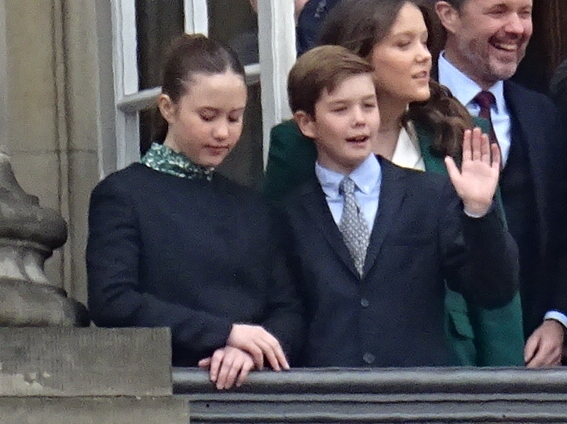
- Vincent and his twin sister Josephine in 2023
- Born: 8 January 2011 (age 15); Rigshospitalet, Copenhagen, Denmark
Names
- Vincent Frederik Minik Alexander
- Father: Frederik X
- Mother: Mary Donaldson

Prince Vincent of Denmark, Count of Monpezat RE (Vincent Frederik Minik Alexander; born 8 January 2011) is a member of the Danish royal family. He is the third child and younger son of King Frederik X and Queen Mary, the sixth grandchild and youngest grandson of Queen Margrethe II and Prince Henrik, and the older twin brother of Princess Josephine.

Vincent is third in line to the Danish throne, after his older brother, Crown Prince Christian, and older sister, Princess Isabella.

== Birth and early life ==
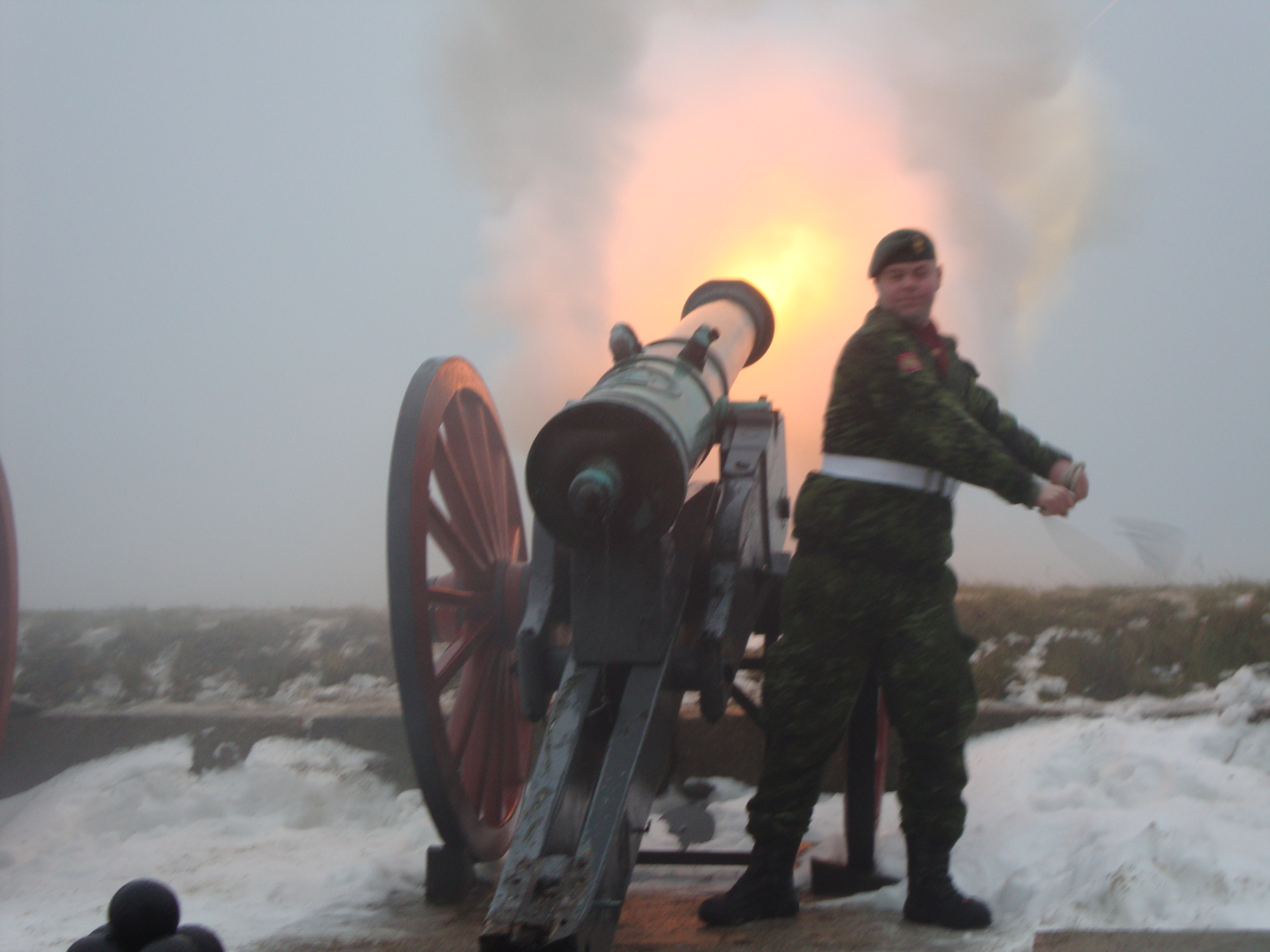
21-gun salute from Kronborg Castle at the occasion of the birth of Prince Vincent and Princess Josephine on 8 January 2011

Vincent was born on 8 January 2011 at Rigshospitalet, the Copenhagen University Hospital, in Copenhagen, at 10:30 am local time, 26 minutes before his twin sister. Shortly after the birth, while speaking to the press, the Crown Prince joked about calling his newborn son Elvis, as the twins share a birthday with Elvis Presley. At noon on 8 January, a 21-gun salute was fired from the Sixtus Battery at Holmen Naval Base in the Port of Copenhagen and from Kronborg Castle in Elsinore in North Zealand to mark the arrival of the royal children.

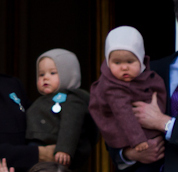
Prince Vincent and Princess Josephine in January 2012

Vincent and his sister were baptised by the royal confessor, the Bishop of Copenhagen Erik Norman Svendsen, on 14 April at the Church of Holmen in central Copenhagen. The twins were baptised at the royal baptismal font which has been used for the baptism of royal children in Denmark since 1671. Prince Vincent wore the royal christening gown which was made for his great-great-grandfather, King Christian X, in 1870, while his sister wore a gown found among Queen Ingrid's belongings. His name was announced as Vincent Frederik Minik Alexander. His third name, Minik, is Greenlandic and means "earwax". His godparents are his maternal uncle, John Stuart Donaldson; his father's first cousin, the Prince of Sayn-Wittgenstein-Berleburg (then the Hereditary Prince); his mother's lady-in-waiting, Caroline Heering; and friends of his parents, the King of Spain (then the Prince of Asturias), Count Michael Ahlefeldt-Laurvig-Bille and Baroness Helle Reedtz-Thott.

In 2009, the Danish constitution was altered, granting absolute primogeniture to the Danish throne, meaning that the eldest child, regardless of gender, takes precedence in the line of succession. Under the old system of male-preference primogeniture, Vincent would have displaced his elder sister Isabella in the line of succession; with the new law, he comes directly after her instead.

On 15 August 2017, Vincent and his younger twin sister started school at Tranegårdsskolen in Gentofte – the same public school as their elder siblings. Both siblings were confirmed on 18 April 2026.

== Titles, styles, and honours ==
Royal Monogram of Prince Vincent of Denmark

Vincent is styled as His Royal Highness Prince Vincent of Denmark, Count of Monpezat.

=== Honours ===
==== National honours ====
===== Orders and appointments =====
- Knight of the Order of the Elephant (14 January 2024) (R.E.)

===== Medals and decorations =====
- Queen Margrethe II's Ruby Jubilee Medal (14 January 2012)
- Queen Margrethe II's 75th Birthday Medal (16 April 2015)
- Queen Margrethe II and Prince Henrik's Golden Wedding Anniversary Medal (10 June 2017)
- Prince Henrik's Memorial Medal (11 June 2018)
- Queen Margrethe II's 80th Birthday Medal (16 April 2020)
- Queen Margrethe II's Golden Jubilee Medal (14 January 2022)

Prince Vincent of Denmark Born: 8 January 2011
Lines of succession
Preceded by Princess Isabella of Denmark	Succession to the Danish throne 3rd position	Succeeded by Princess Josephine of Denmark
