= Crown Prince Frederik Land =

Area in northern Greenland

Crown Prince Frederik Land Kunngissaq Frederik Nuna (Greenlandic) Kronprins Frederik Land (Danish)
- Geographical Region
- Sovereign state: (Danish Realm) Denmark
- Autonomous Territory: Greenland
- Administrative division: Northeast Greenland National Park
- Named for: Crown Prince Frederik

Crown Prince Frederik Land (Greenlandic: Kunngissaq Frederik Nuna; Danish: Kronprins Frederik Land) is an area in the northernmost part of Greenland that is named after the current Danish king, Frederik X. It is bordered to the west by Knud Rasmussen Land, to the north by Peary Land and to the east by King Frederik VIII Land.

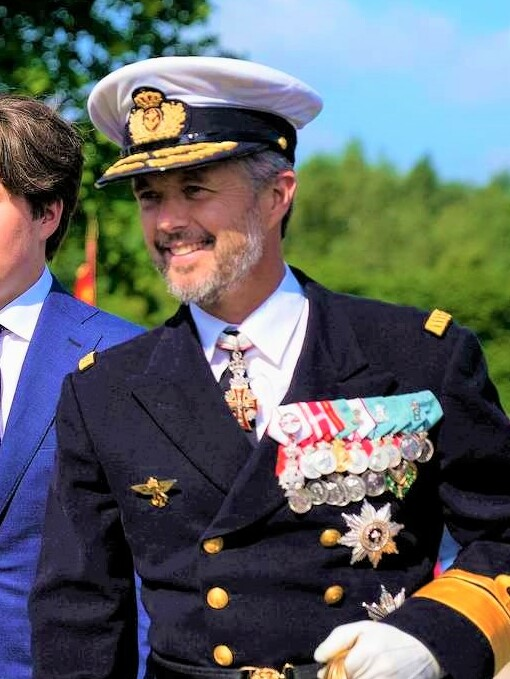
Frederik X (r. 2024–present), formerly Crown Prince, whom the area is named after

The territory was awarded by the first Prime Minister of Greenland, Jonathan Motzfeldt in 2000, after the then crown prince completed a four-month-long expedition from Qaanaaq (Thule) and north of Greenland down to Sled Patrol Sirius' headquarters in Daneborg, an expedition that stretched over 3000 km and completed by dog sled.
