= Princess Isabella of Denmark =

Danish princess (born 2007)

Princess Isabella
- Countess of Monpezat
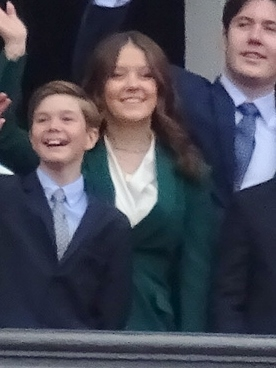
- Isabella in 2023
- Born: 21 April 2007 (age 19); Rigshospitalet, Copenhagen, Denmark
Names
- Isabella Henrietta Ingrid Margrethe
- Father: Frederik X
- Mother: Mary Donaldson
- Education: Tranegård School; Lemania-Verbier International School; Ingrid Jespersens Gymnasieskole; Øregård Gymnasium
- Military career
- Allegiance: Denmark
- Branch: Royal Danish Army
- Rank: Conscript
- Unit: Guard Hussar Regiment

Princess Isabella of Denmark, Countess of Monpezat, RE (Isabella Henrietta Ingrid Margrethe; born 21 April 2007) is a member of the Danish royal family. She is the second child and elder daughter of King Frederik X and Queen Mary.

She is the fourth grandchild and oldest granddaughter of Queen Margrethe II and Prince Henrik. She was the first girl born into the Danish royal family since the birth of her great-aunt, Queen Anne-Marie of Greece, in 1946. Isabella is second in the line of succession to the Danish throne, after her older brother, Crown Prince Christian.

== Early life and education ==
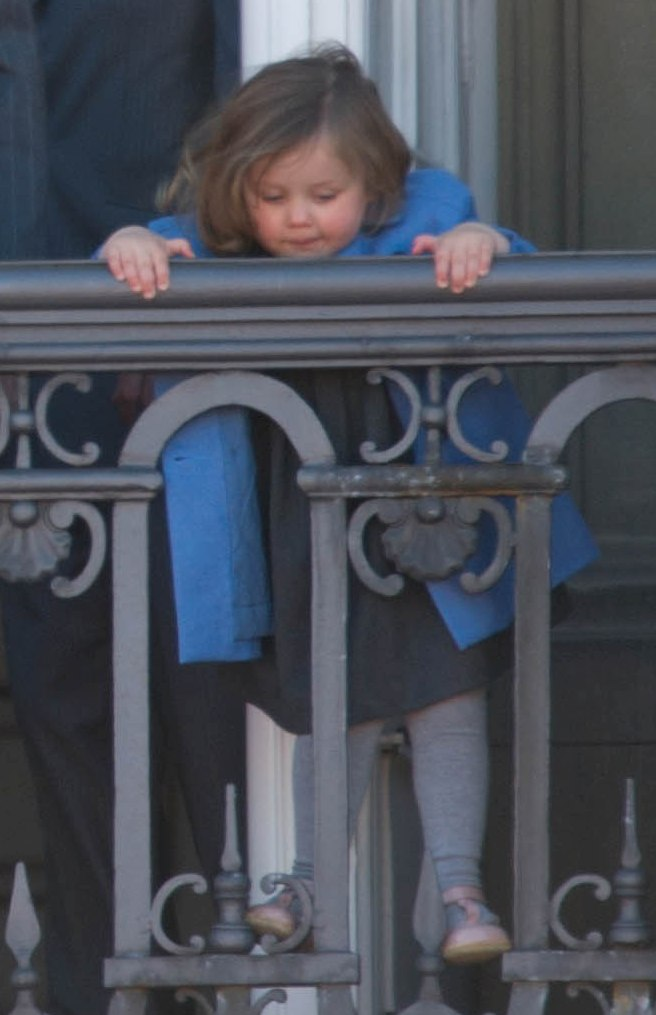
Princess Isabella in 2010

Isabella was born on 21 April 2007 at 16:02 CET at Rigshospitalet, the Copenhagen University Hospital, in Copenhagen, to then Crown Prince Frederik and Crown Princess Mary. The following day, public buses and official buildings flew the Danish flag, the Dannebrog, and at noon a 21-gun salute was fired from the Sixtus Battery at Holmen Naval Base in the Port of Copenhagen and from Kronborg Castle in North Zealand to mark her birth. Incidentally, Isabella was the first princess whose birth was marked with 21 shots, as the number of shots in the cannon salute had previously been different depending on the sex of the newborn, as 21 shots were fired for a boy and 17 shots for a girl. Before Prince Christian was born in October 2005, the palace decided that 21 shots should be fired, regardless of the child's sex.

Her christening took place on 1 July 2007 at the Royal Chapel of Fredensborg Palace and was performed by the Bishop of Copenhagen Erik Norman Svendsen. She was baptised at the royal baptismal font which has been used for the baptism of royal children in Denmark since 1671, and wore the royal christening gown which was made for her great-great-grandfather, King Christian X, in 1870. At the christening, her name, per Danish royal tradition, was revealed to be Isabella Henrietta Ingrid Margrethe, after the Danish queen consort and ancestress Isabella of Austria, the princess's maternal grandmother, paternal great-grandmother, and paternal grandmother respectively. Her godparents were her father's first cousin, Princess Alexia of Greece and Denmark; Queen Mathilde of Belgium (then Duchess of Brabant), Nadine Johnston, Christian Buchwald, Peter Heering and Marie Louise Skeel. Isabella received the Lutheran rite of confirmation in the same chapel on 30 April 2022, which was presided over by Henrik Wigh-Poulsen, the Danish royal Chaplain-in-Ordinary.

With the passing of the 2009 Danish Act of Succession referendum, Isabella became the first princess in Danish history to not get bypassed by a younger brother when Prince Vincent was born in 2011.

On 13 August 2013, Isabella started school at Tranegårdsskolen in Gentofte, the same public school as her older brother. In January 2020, Isabella and her three siblings initiated a 12-week school stay at Lemania-Verbier International School in Verbier, Switzerland. The stay was eventually cut short and the siblings returned home in March due to the intensification of the COVID-19 situation in Denmark. In March 2022, it was announced that Isabella would continue her education at Herlufsholm School starting in August 2022. On 26 June 2022, her parents announced in a statement that Isabella would not start Herlufsholm after all due to revelations of recurring problems of bullying, violence and sexual abuse at the school, and in September 2022, she started 9th form at Ingrid Jespersens Gymnasieskole in Copenhagen instead. In August 2023, Isabella started upper secondary school at Øregård Gymnasium (the same school her father, Frederik, and uncle, Joachim, previously attended), from which she graduated in June 2026.

=== Military service ===
It was announced in March 2026, that Isabella would be conscripted into the Guard Hussar Regiment in the Royal Danish Army in August 2026. She arrived for five-months of military training to be followed by six-months of military service on 3 August 2026, and has declined to accept any of her military salary or expenses, while conscripted. Traditionally, the hussars are known by the name of their respective home towns. Thus Isabella was given the name Fredensborg in reference to Fredensborg Palace where she grew up.

== Public life ==
Isabella undertook her first official engagement, the baptism of a ferry – the M/F Prinsesse Isabella operating between Jutland and Samsø – named in her honour, on 6 June 2015. She and her siblings accompanied their parents on official visits to Greenland on 1–8 August 2014 and the Faroe Islands on 23–26 August 2018 where she partook in several official engagements.

Her 18th birthday was marked with two public celebrations: On 11 April 2025, Aarhus Municipality hosted a reception at the city hall featuring tributes from the city's young talents in creative fields such as music, gastronomy and fashion. During the reception, Isabella made her first ever public speech, thanking the city and the participants for a "very unique" birthday celebration. The speech was subsequently praised as being "brave" and "charming". On 15 April, the Danish court and the Royal Danish Theatre hosted a birthday performance for Isabella at the theatre's Old Stage featuring performances from the field of ballet, theatre, music and opera. Youths between the age of 17 and 24 from across the kingdom were eligible to apply for tickets to the performance which was also attended by her parents and three siblings; her grandmother, Queen Margrethe II; her cousins, Count Nikolai and Count Felix of Monpezat; her great-aunts, Princess Benedikte of Denmark and Queen Anne-Marie of Greece; as well as the Prince and Princess of Sayn-Wittgenstein-Berleburg.

== Titles, styles, and honours ==
Royal monogram

Isabella was originally styled "Her Royal Highness Princess Isabella of Denmark". Since 29 April 2008, she has been styled "Her Royal Highness Princess Isabella of Denmark, Countess of Monpezat".

=== Honours ===
==== National honours ====
===== Orders and appointments =====
- Knight of the Order of the Elephant (14 January 2024) (R.E.)

===== Medals and decorations =====
- Dame of the Royal Family Decoration of King Frederik X (21 April 2025)
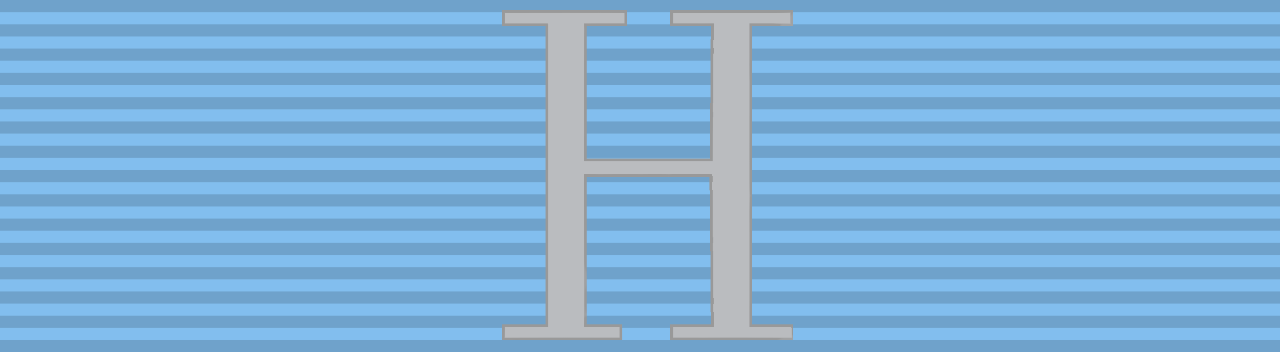
- Prince Henrik's 75th Birthday Medal (11 June 2009)
- Queen Margrethe II's 70th Birthday Medal (16 April 2010)
- Queen Margrethe II's Ruby Jubilee Medal (14 January 2012)
- Queen Margrethe II's 75th Birthday Medal (16 April 2015)
- Queen Margrethe II and Prince Henrik's Golden Wedding Anniversary Medal (10 June 2017)
- Prince Henrik's Memorial Medal (11 June 2018)
- Queen Margrethe II's 80th Birthday Medal (16 April 2020)
- Queen Margrethe II's Golden Jubilee Medal (14 January 2022)

Princess Isabella of Denmark Born: 21 April 2007
Lines of succession
Preceded by The Crown Prince of Denmark	Succession to the Danish throne 2nd position	Succeeded by Prince Vincent of Denmark
