= Order of the Elephant =

Danish order of chivalry

Order of the Elephant Elefantordenen
- Collar of the Order of the Elephant

Awarded by Sovereign of Denmark
- Type: Chivalric order in one class
- Motto: Magnanimi Pretium (Latin: The prize of greatness)
- Awarded for: At the Monarch's pleasure
- Status: Currently constituted
- Sovereign: Frederik X
- Grades: Knight (Danish: Ridder, abbr.: R.E.)

Statistics
- First induction: 1693 Christian V of Denmark
- Last induction: 2026 (Vietnam) Tô Lâm

Precedence
- Next (higher): None (Highest)
- Next (lower): Order of the Dannebrog
- Order of the Elephant ribbon

Coat of arms of Frederick X of Denmark and Norway surrounded by the collars of the Order of the Elephant and the Order of the Dannebrog

The Order of the Elephant (Danish: Elefantordenen) is a Danish order of chivalry and is Denmark's highest-ranked honour. It has origins in the 15th century, but has officially existed since 1693, and since the establishment of constitutional monarchy in 1849, is now almost exclusively used to honour royalty and heads of state.

== History ==
A Danish religious confraternity called the "Fellowship of the Mother of God", limited to about fifty members of the Danish aristocracy, was founded during the reign of Christian I during the 15th century. The badge of the confraternity showed the Virgin Mary holding her Son within a crescent moon and surrounded with the rays of the sun, and was hung from a collar of links in the form of elephants much like the present collar of the Order. After the Reformation in 1536, the confraternity died out, but a badge in the form of an elephant with his profile on its right side was still awarded by Frederick II. This latter badge may have been inspired by the badge of office of the chaplain of the confraternity which is known to have been in the form of an elephant. The order was instituted in its current form on 1 December 1693 by King Christian V as having only one class consisting of only 30 noble knights in addition to the Grand Master (i.e., the king) and his sons. The statutes of the order were amended in 1958 by a Royal Ordinance so that both men and women could be members of the order.

The elephant and castle design derives from the howdah, a carriage that is mounted in the back of an elephant. This type of carriage was mostly utilized in the Indian subcontinent, and the Danish adopted this design since they ruled parts of India as part of their small colonial empire. The unfamiliar Indian howdah has been replaced in this instance by a familiar European castle, although the Indian rider has been kept on the elephant.

== Composition ==
The Danish monarch is the head of the order. The members of the royal family are members of the order, and foreign heads of state are also inducted. In very exceptional circumstances a commoner may also be admitted. The most recent member of the order who was neither a current nor former head of state nor royal was Mærsk Mc-Kinney Møller, a leading industrialist and philanthropist.

The order of the Elephant has one class: Knight of the Order of the Elephant (Ridder af Elefantordenen, usually abbreviated as R.E. in letters et cetera). Knights of the order are granted a place in the 1st Class of the Danish order of precedence.

== Insignia and habits ==
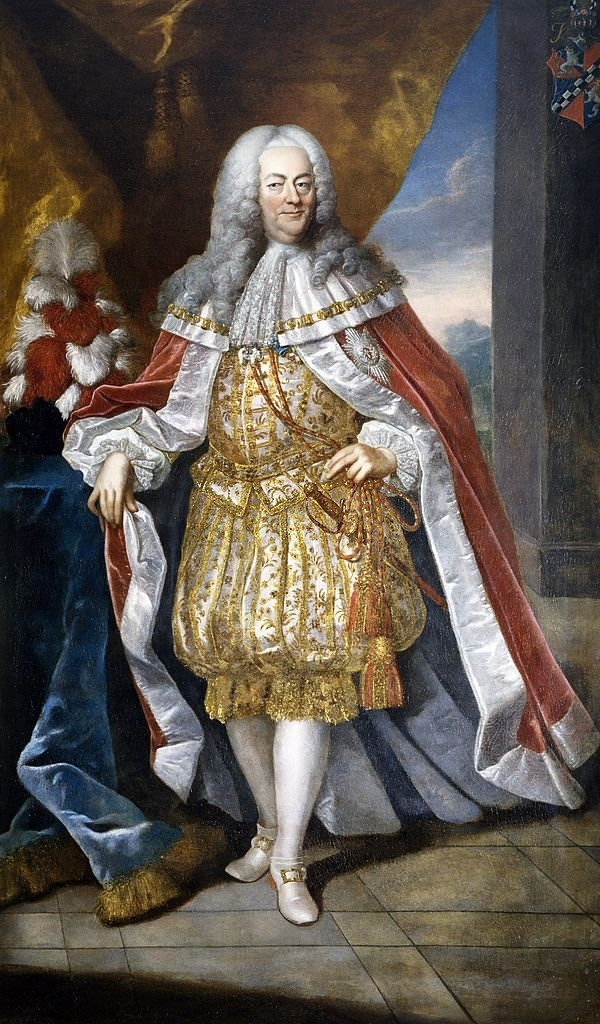
Iver Rosenkrantz wearing the robes of the Order

- The collar of the order is of gold. It consists of alternating elephants and towers. On the cover of the elephants there is a D which stands for Dania, mediaeval Latin for Denmark. According to the statutes of the order, the collar is usually worn on New Year's Day (during the Danish monarch's New Year's Court) and on major occasions (coronations or jubilees) only.
- The badge of the order is an elephant made of white-enamelled gold with blue housings. It is about 5 cm high. On its back the elephant is bearing a watch tower of pink enameled masonry encircled by a row of small table cut diamonds at the bottom with another row just below the crenellation at the top. In front of the tower and behind the elephant's head (which has a diamond set in its forehead and smaller diamonds for its eyes) a colorfully attired and turbaned Moor mahout is sitting, holding a golden rod; on the right side of the elephant there is a cross of five large table cut diamonds and on the left side the elephant bears the crowned monogram of the monarch reigning when it was made. At the top of the tower is a large enameled gold ring from which the badge can be hung from the collar or tied to the sash of the Order. There are about 72 elephants at the chancery of the Order or in circulation. It is estimated that together with an unknown number of elephants in museums around the world, the total number of the elephants is about a hundred.
- The star of the order is an eight-pointed silver star with smooth rays. At its center there is a red enameled disc with a white cross, surrounded by a laurel wreath in silver. It is worn on the left side of the chest.
- The sash of the order is of light-blue silk moiré and 10 cm wide for men 6 cm wide for women. It is placed on the left shoulder with the elephant resting against the right hip. The collar is not worn when the sash is used.
- The order originally had a distinctive habit worn by the knights on very solemn occasions consisting of a white doublet, white breeches, white stockings and white shoes, over which was worn a red mantle with a white lining and with the star of the order embroidered in silver on left side. Over this red mantle was worn a short white shoulder cape with a standing collar, embroidered with scattering of numerous gold flames, upon which was worn the collar of the order (the habit was always worn with the collar of the order, never its ribbon). The habit also had a black hat with a plume of white and red ostrich feathers. This habit was almost identical to that worn by the knights of the Order of the Dannebrog.

Upon the death of a Knight of the Order of the Elephant, the insignia of the order must be returned. There are a few exceptions known.

- Paris, Chancellery museum – collar on display
- Sash and badge of Dwight Eisenhower, on display at his presidential library in the US.

== Current knights and officers ==
=== Sovereign of the Royal Danish Orders of Chivalry ===
- The King of Denmark

=== Current Knights of the Elephant listed by date of appointment ===
Name	Date appointed	Notes
Queen Margrethe II of Denmark	20 April 1947	Royal family Then Princess Margrethe of Denmark
(Denmark) The Dowager Princess of Sayn-Wittgenstein-Berleburg	20 April 1947	Royal family Then Princess Benedikte of Denmark
(Denmark) Queen Anne-Marie of the Hellenes	20 April 1947	Royal family Then Princess Anne-Marie of Denmark
The Emperor Emeritus of Japan	8 August 1953	Then Crown Prince
(Denmark) Count Ingolf of Rosenborg	17 February 1961	Royal family Then Prince Ingolf of Denmark
Empress Farah of Iran	3 May 1963	Then Empress consort
The King of Sweden	12 January 1965	Then Crown Prince
(Japan) The Prince Hitachi	28 September 1965	
King Albert II of Belgium	18 June 1968	Then Prince of Liège
Prince Joachim of Denmark	14 January 1972	Royal family
(Sweden) Princess Christina, Mrs. Magnuson	6 January 1973	Then Princess Christina of Sweden
Queen Sonja of Norway	12 February 1973	Then Crown Princess
The King of the United Kingdom	30 April 1974	Then Prince of Wales
Princess Beatrix of the Netherlands	29 October 1975	Former Queen
King Juan Carlos I of Spain	17 March 1980	Then King
Queen Sofía of Spain	17 March 1980	Then Queen consort Born Princess of Greece and Denmark
(Iceland) Vigdís Finnbogadóttir	25 February 1981	President of Iceland (–)
(Portugal) António Ramalho Eanes	25 June 1984	President of Portugal (–)
The Queen of Sweden	3 September 1985	
The King of Norway	20 July 1991	Then Crown Prince
Princess Märtha Louise of Norway	13 October 1992	
(Poland) Lech Wałęsa	5 July 1993	President of Poland (–)
Queen Paola of Belgium	16 May 1995	Then Queen consort
The Crown Princess of Sweden	14 July 1995	
(Denmark) The Countess of Frederiksborg	17 November 1995	Formerly Princess Alexandra of Denmark
(Iceland) Ólafur Ragnar Grímsson	18 November 1996	President of Iceland (–)
Crown Prince Pavlos of Greece	14 January 1997	Also Prince of Denmark
(Latvia) Guntis Ulmanis	18 March 1997	President of Latvia (1993–1999)
The King of the Netherlands	31 January 1998	Then Prince of Orange
Queen Noor Al Hussein of Jordan	27 April 1998	Then Queen consort
The Empress Emerita of Japan	2 June 1998	Then Empress consort
(Brazil) Fernando Henrique Cardoso	3 May 1999	President of Brazil (1995–2002)
(Romania) Emil Constantinescu	23 May 2000	President of Romania (–)
(Bulgaria) Petar Stoyanov	17 October 2000	President of Bulgaria (1997–2002)
The King of Thailand	7 February 2001	Then Crown Prince
(Finland) Tarja Halonen	3 April 2001	President of Finland (2000–2012)
(Slovenia) Milan Kučan	10 October 2001	President of Slovenia (–)
(Belgium) The King of the Belgians	28 May 2002	Then Duke of Brabant
Grand Duke Henri Luxembourg	20 October 2003	Then Grand Duke
Grand Duchess Maria Teresa Luxembourg	20 October 2003	Then Grand Duchess
The Queen of Denmark	9 May 2004	Royal family Then Mary Donaldson
The Emperor of Japan	16 November 2004	Then Crown Prince
(Bulgaria) Georgi Parvanov	29 March 2006	President of Bulgaria (2002–2012)
(Brazil) Luiz Inácio Lula da Silva	12 September 2007	President of Brazil (2003–2010; 2023–present)
(Mexico) Felipe Calderón Hinojosa	18 February 2008	President of Mexico (–)
Princess Marie of Denmark	24 May 2008	Royal family
(South Korea) Lee Myung-bak	11 May 2011	President of South Korea (–)
(Slovakia) Ivan Gašparovič	23 October 2012	President of Slovakia (–)
(Finland) Sauli Niinistö	4 April 2013	President of Finland (2012–2024)
The Queen of Norway	17 May 2014	Then Crown Princess
(Croatia) Ivo Josipović	21 October 2014	President of Croatia (2010–2015)
The Queen of the Netherlands	17 March 2015	
(Mexico) Enrique Peña Nieto	13 April 2016	President of Mexico (–)
(Iceland) Guðni Thorlacius Jóhannesson	24 January 2017	President of Iceland (–)
(Belgium) The Queen of the Belgians	28 March 2017	
(France) Emmanuel Macron	28 August 2018	President of France (2017–present)
(Germany) Frank-Walter Steinmeier	10 November 2021	President of Germany (2017–present)
The Crown Princess of Norway	21 January 2022	Then Princess Ingrid Alexandra of Norway
The Crown Prince of Denmark	15 October 2023	Royal family Then Prince Christian of Denmark
The King of Spain	6 November 2023	
The Queen of Spain	6 November 2023	
Princess Isabella of Denmark	14 January 2024	Royal family
Prince Vincent of Denmark	14 January 2024	Royal family
Princess Josephine of Denmark	14 January 2024	Royal family
(Sweden) Prince Daniel, Duke of Västergötland	6 May 2024	
(Iceland) Halla Tómasdóttir	8 October 2024	President of Iceland (2024–present)
(Egypt) Abdel Fattah el-Sisi	6 December 2024	President of Egypt (2014–present)
(Finland) Alexander Stubb	4 March 2025	President of Finland (2024–present)
(Latvia) Edgars Rinkēvičs	28 October 2025	President of Latvia (2023–present)
(Estonia) Alar Karis	27 January 2026	President of Estonia (2021–present)
(Lithuania) Gitanas Nausėda	28 January 2026	President of Lithuania (2019–present)
(Vietnam) Tô Lâm	19 October 2026	President of Vietnam (2026–present)

=== Officers of the Chapter of the Royal Danish Orders of Chivalry ===
==== Chancellor of the Chapter ====
- 1808–1818: Joachim Godske Moltke, S.K., Privy Councillor of Denmark, Chamberlain
- 1824–1827: Frederik Julius Kaas, S.K., Privy Councillor of Denmark, Chamberlain
- 1828–1843: Johan Sigismund von Møsting, Minister of Finance
- 1843–1855: Poul Christian Stemann, Privy Councillor of Denmark
- 1856–1864: Adam Wilhelm Moltke, S.K., Prime Minister of Denmark
- 1864–1866: Count Carl Moltke, Privy Councillor of Denmark
- 1874–1889: F.F. Tillisch, Minister of the Interior
- 1889–1894: Sophus Danneskiold-Samsøe, S.K.
- 1894–1911: Prince Hans of Glücksburg, S.Kmd.
- 1911–1914: Christian Danneskiold-Samsøe, S.K.
- 1914–1949: Prince Harald of Denmark, S.Kmd.
- 1949–1968: Prince Viggo, Count of Rosenborg, S.Kmd.
- 1968–2009: Prince Consort Henrik of Denmark, S.Kmd.
- 2009–: Prince Joachim of Denmark, S.Kmd.

==== Historiographer of the Chapter ====
- 1808–1821: Abraham Kall, historian
- 1827–1851: Laurids Engelstoft, S.K., historian
- 1852–1893: C.F. Wegener, S.K., historian
- 1897–1921: Troels Troels-Lund, S.K., historian
- 1921–1951: Louis Bobé, K.1., historian
- 1951–1957: Bjørn Kornerup, K.1., historian
- 1958–1976: Albert Fabritius, K., historian
- 1976–1994: Tage Kaarsted, K., historian
- 1994–2018: Knud J.V. Jespersen, K.1., historian
- 2018–2026: Jes Fabricius-Møller, historian
- 2026–: Ronny Skov Andersen, historian

==== Secretary of the Chapter ====
- 1671–1690: Bolle Luxdorph
- 1690–1742: Vincents Lerche, Master of Ceremonies
- 1742–1748: Niels Gersdorff, Chamberlain
- 1749–1771: Victor Christian von Plessen
- 1771–1778: Volrad August von der Lühe, Chamberlain
- 1778–1784: Engel Schack, Lord Chamberlain
- 1790–1791: Joachim Ulrich von Sperling
- 1792–1793: Johan Bülow, S.K., Lord Chamberlain
- 1793–1794: Ferdinand Ahlefeldt
- 1794–1808: Adam Wilhelm Hauch, Lord Chamberlain
- 1808–1836: Frederik Moltke, Prime Minister of Denmark
- 1840–1858: Carl Emil Moltke, Chamberlain
- 1860–1871: E.C. Werlauff, S.K., historian
- 1874–1885: J.P. Trap, private secretary to Frederik VII and Christian IX of Denmark
- 1888–1910): F.V.F. Rosenstand, private secretary to Christian IX of Denmark
- 1912–1936: Anthonius Krieger, Chamberlain and private secretary to Christian X of Denmark
- 1936–1957: Gunnar Bardenfleth, private secretary to Christian X and Frederik IX of Denmark
- 1957–1972: Morten Olufsen, Chamberlain and private secretary to Frederik IX of Denmark
- 1972–1987: Mogens Wahl, Chamberlain and private secretary to Margrethe II of Denmark
- 1987–2007: Niels Eilschou Holm, private secretary to Margrethe II of Denmark
- 2007–2024: Henning Fode, Chamberlain and private secretary to Margrethe II of Denmark

==== Treasurer of the Chapter ====
- 1808–1826: Johan Sigismund von Møsting, Minister of Finance
- 1826–1828: Ove Ramel Sehested, Minister of the Privy Council
- 1828–1831: Frantz Bülow
- 1831–1833: Johan Frederik Bardenfleth
- 1834–1840: Christian Ove Haxthausen, Chamberlain
- 1840–1852: Frederik Bardenfleth
- 1852–?: Sophus Danneskiold-Samsøe, S.K.
- 1876–1888: C.G.W. Johannsen, LL.D.
- 1888–1898: Carl Løvenskiold, Chamberlain
- 1898–1905: Ludvig Castenskiold
- 1905–1909: Hugo Egmont Hørring
- 1909–1918: Christian Moltke
- 1918–1933: Frederik Raben-Levetzau, Minister of Foreign Affairs
- 1944–1954: Johannes Hørring, LL.D.
- 1955–?: Rudolf Lassen
- 1991–2010: Paul Henning Fischer, LL.D., Ambassador, Chamberlain
- 2010–: Per Thornit, Chamberlain

== Other notable knights ==
Previous knights have included:

- James III, King of Scots and son-in-law of Christian I of Denmark (1469)
- Tycho Brahe, astronomer (1578)
- Heinrich Rantzau, German-Danish humanist, writer, astrologer and statesman (1580)
- Jacob van Wassenaer Obdam, Dutch lieutenant-admiral (1659)
- Egbert Bartholomeusz Kortenaer, Dutch vice-admiral (1659)
- Cornelis Tromp, Dutch and Danish admiral-general (1676)
- Ernst Albrecht von Eberstein, military leader (1676)
- Ernst Heinrich von Schimmelmann, politician and landowner (1790)
- Duke William Frederick Philip of Württemberg, Danish general and Governor of Copenhagen during the (Battle of Copenhagen (1801))
- Albert, Prince Consort, (10 January 1843)
- Emperor Dom Pedro II of Brazil.
- J.B.S. Estrup, Danish landowner, politician and President of the Council of State (1878)
- Victor Emmanuel III, King of Italy (1891)
- Grand Duke Nicholas Nikolaevich of Russia (1909)
- Vilhelm Thomsen, professor, Dr. Phil., Danish linguist (1912)
- H.N. Andersen, Danish businessman, Consul-General, titular Councilor of State (1919)
- C.G.E. Mannerheim, President of the Republic of Finland, Marshal of Finland (1919)
- Umberto II, King of Italy, then Prince of Piedmont as heir to the throne (1922)
- Hirohito, Emperor of Japan then Crown prince (1923)
- Stanisław Wojciechowski, President of the Republic of Poland (1923)
- Tomáš Masaryk, President of the Czechoslovak Republic (1925)
- Reza Shah of Persia (former name of Iran) (1937)
- Miklós Horthy, Austro-Hungarian vice-admiral, Regent of the Kingdom of Hungary (1940)
- Bernard Law Montgomery, 1st Viscount Montgomery of Alamein, British Field Marshal (1945)
- Dwight D. Eisenhower, President of the United States of America, General of the Army (1945)
- Niels Bohr, professor, Dr. Phil. & Scient. & Techn., Danish physicist and Nobel laureate, Manifested Copenhagen interpretation ("atom theory") (1947)
- Prince Philip, Duke of Edinburgh (1947)
- Queen Elizabeth II of the United Kingdom (then Princess) (1947)
- Sir Winston Churchill, British prime minister and Nobel laureate (1950)
- Haile Selassie, Emperor of Ethiopia (21 November 1954)
- Mohammad Reza Pahlavi, Shah of Iran (1959)
- Princess Elisabeth of Denmark, Danish diplomat and cousin of Margrethe II of Denmark (1962)
- King Constantine II of Greece (1962)
- Julius Nyerere, President of the United Republic of Tanzania (1970)
- Josip Broz Tito, President of the Socialist Federative Republic of Yugoslavia (1974)
- Richard von Weizsäcker, President of the Federal Republic of Germany (1989)
- Nicolae Ceaușescu, President of the Socialist Republic of Romania (Note: Awarded on the November 1980 state visit to Denmark, but revoked by the Queen on 23 December 1989. The insignia have been returned to Denmark and Ceaușescu's name has been deleted from the official rolls.)
- Oscar Luigi Scalfaro, President of the Italian Republic (1993)
- Nelson Mandela, President of the Republic of South Africa (1996)
- Mærsk Mc-Kinney Møller, Danish shipping magnate (2000)

== See also ==
- Elephant and castle symbol
- Order of the Dannebrog
