= Royal christening gown =

Item of baptismal clothing used by a royal family

A royal christening gown is an item of baptismal clothing used by a royal family at family christenings. Among those presently maintaining such a tradition are the royal families of the United Kingdom, Denmark, the Netherlands, Norway, Spain, and Sweden. In most of these families, the practice extends back more than a century: as of 2019, the Swedish gown had been in use for 113 years, the Dutch gown for 139 years, and the Danish gown for 149 years; the current British gown, a replica of the garment used for 163 years, has been in service since 2008. The Spanish gown has been used for 81 years.

Although these families traditionally reuse the same gowns across generations, some members have chosen to use purpose‑bought gowns for their own children. In 1867, at the christening of Prince Christian Victor of Schleswig-Holstein, his mother, Princess Helena, used a different gown given to her by her mother, Queen Victoria; and Prince Joachim of Denmark has favoured gowns by the Danish designer Henrik Hviid for his children, Count Nikolai, Count Felix, Count Henrik, and Countess Athena.

== United Kingdom ==
British royal christening gown
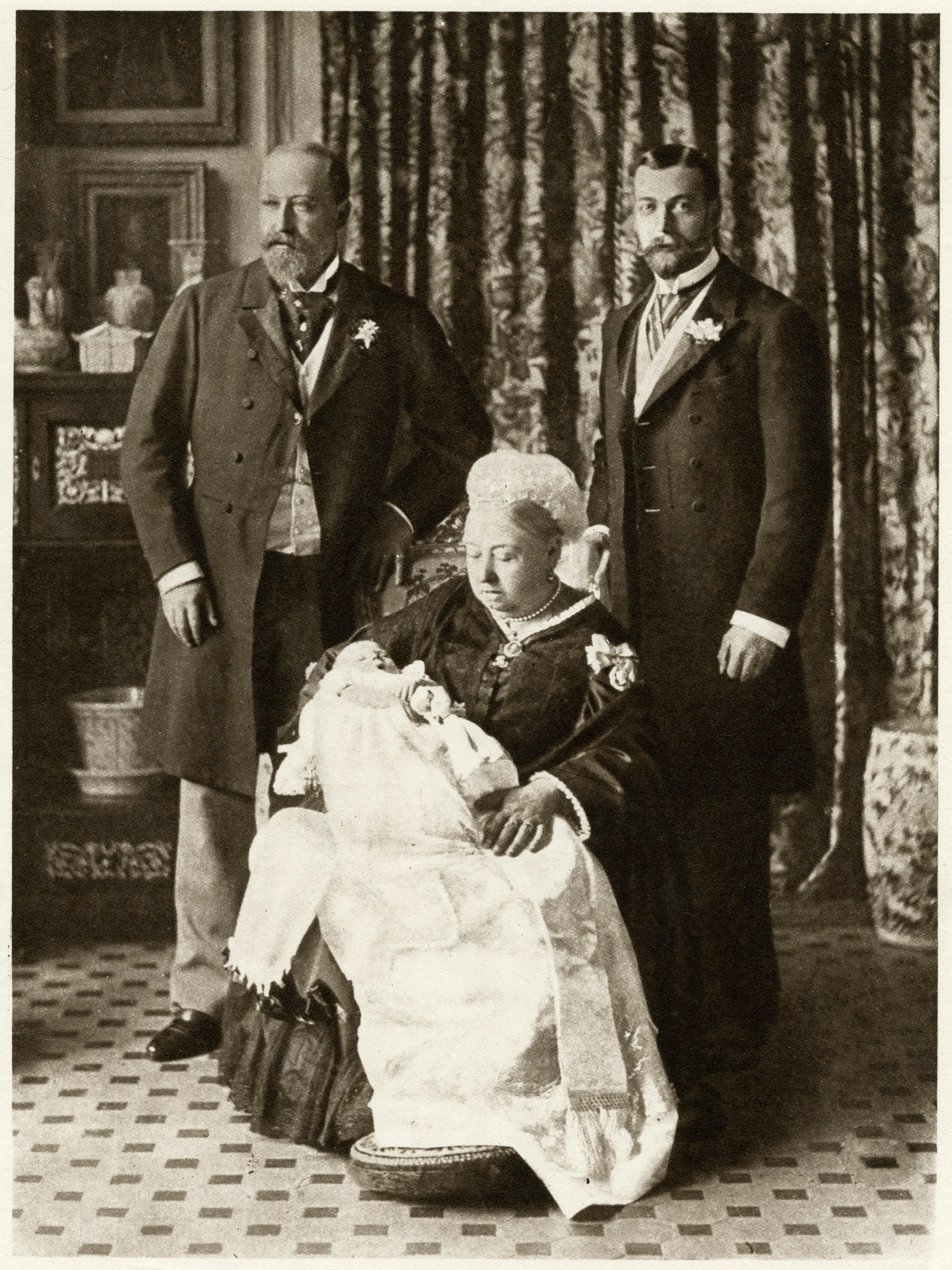
- Edward with his father George, grandfather Edward, and great-grandmother Victoria.
- Designer: Janet Sutherland (original); Angela Kelly (replica)
- Year: 1841 (original); 2008 (replica)
- Type: Baptismal clothing
- Material: Honiton lace Spitalfields silk satin

The Honiton christening gown, or simply the royal christening gown, is an item of baptismal clothing used by the British royal family at every christening. The original gown was created for the christening of Victoria, Princess Royal, in 1841 and was used by the family until 2004, when it was retired for conservation. Elizabeth II commissioned a replica of the 1841 gown, which was first used for the christening of her youngest grandson, James, Viscount Severn, in 2008; this replica remains in use as of 2026.

=== History ===
In 1840, Queen Victoria and Prince Albert's first child, Victoria, Princess Royal, was born. For her christening on 10 February 1841, her parents commissioned both the Lily Font and a new christening gown. The gown was designed by Janet Sutherland, who served as Embroiderer to the Queen. It was made of Honiton lace and Spitalfields silk, and was fashioned after Queen Victoria's wedding dress.

Victoria kept the gown and reused it for all her children and for all her "English grandchildren" (the children of Albert Edward and Alexandra, Alfred and Marie, Arthur and Louise, Leopold and Helena, and Beatrice and Henry). Subsequent generations also continued to use it, including Victoria's great-grandson Lord Louis Mountbatten.

Five kings, four queens, an empress, and a crown princess were christened in the original gown:

Child christened	Life dates	Date and place of christening	Parents
Victoria, Princess Royal (latterly Victoria, German Empress and Queen of Prussia as the wife of Frederick III, German Emperor)	21 November 1840 — 5 August 1901	10 February 1841 — Buckingham Palace	Queen Victoria — and — Prince Albert of Saxe-Coburg and Gotha
Albert Edward, Prince of Wales (latterly King Edward VII of the United Kingdom)	9 November 1841 — 6 May 1910	25 January 1842 — Windsor Castle	Queen Victoria — and — Prince Albert of Saxe-Coburg and Gotha
Prince George of Wales (latterly King George V of the United Kingdom)	3 June 1865 — 20 January 1936	7 July 1865 — Windsor Castle	Albert Edward, Prince of Wales — and — Princess Alexandra of Denmark
Princess Maud of Wales (latterly Queen Maud of Norway as the wife of King Haakon VII of Norway)	26 November 1869 — 20 November 1938	24 December 1869 — Marlborough House	Albert Edward, Prince of Wales — and — Princess Alexandra of Denmark
Princess Marie of Edinburgh (latterly Queen Marie of Romania as the wife of King Ferdinand I of Romania)	29 October 1875 — 18 July 1938	15 December 1875 — Windsor Castle	Prince Alfred, Duke of Edinburgh — and — Grand Duchess Maria Alexandrovna of Russia
Princess Margaret of Connaught (latterly Crown Princess Margaret of Sweden as the wife of Crown Prince Gustaf Adolf of Sweden)	15 January 1882 — 1 May 1920	11 March 1882 — Windsor Castle	Prince Arthur, Duke of Connaught and Strathearn — and — Princess Louise Margaret of Prussia
Princess Victoria Eugenie of Battenberg (latterly Queen Victoria Eugenie of Spain as the wife of King Alfonso XIII of Spain)	24 October 1887 — 15 April 1969	23 November 1887 — Balmoral Castle	Prince Henry of Battenberg — and — Princess Beatrice of the United Kingdom
Prince Edward of York (latterly King Edward VIII of the United Kingdom)	23 June 1894 — 28 May 1972	16 July 1894 — White Lodge, Richmond Park	Prince George, Duke of York — and — Princess Mary of Teck
Prince Albert of York (latterly King George VI of the United Kingdom)	14 December 1895 — 6 February 1952	17 February 1896 — St Mary Magdalene Church, Sandringham	Prince George, Duke of York — and — Princess Mary of Teck
Princess Elizabeth of York (latterly Queen Elizabeth II of the United Kingdom)	21 April 1926 — 8 September 2022	29 May 1926 — Buckingham Palace	Prince Albert, Duke of York — and — Lady Elizabeth Bowes-Lyon
Prince Charles of Edinburgh (latterly King Charles III of the United Kingdom)	14 November 1948 — (age 77 years, 315 days old)	15 December 1948 — Buckingham Palace	Princess Elizabeth, Duchess of Edinburgh — and — Philip, Duke of Edinburgh

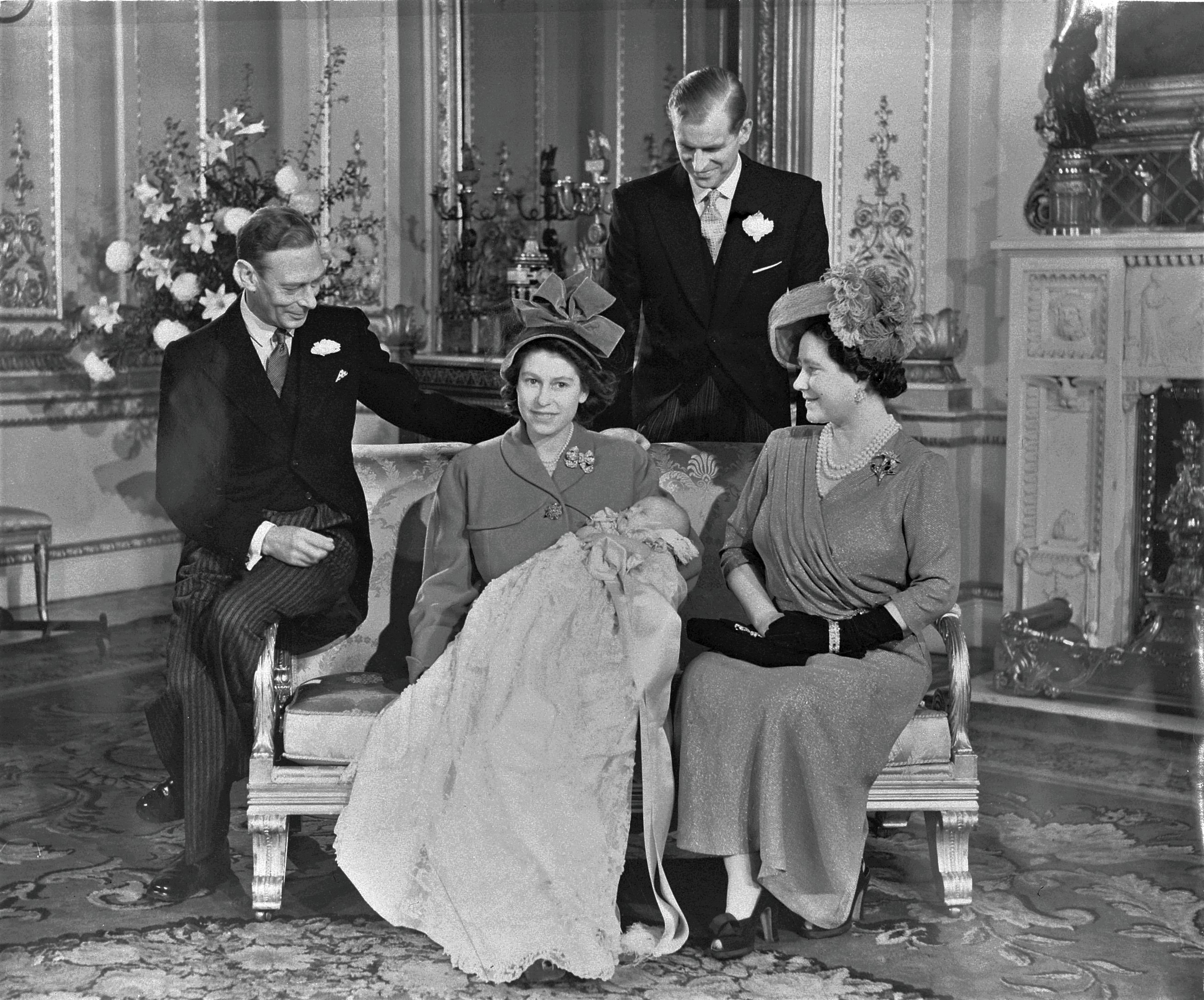
Prince Charles of Edinburgh (later King Charles III) wears the original gown at his christening in 1948. He is held by his mother Princess Elizabeth, Duchess of Edinburgh (later Queen Elizabeth II) as his father the Duke of Edinburgh (standing behind) and his maternal grandparents King George VI and Queen Elizabeth look on.

In total, the original gown was used by 62 royal children over a period of 163 years, including the present King, Charles III. Both Charles' sons – his heir apparent William, Prince of Wales, and his younger son, Prince Harry, Duke of Sussex – were christened in the original gown, while four of their children (George, Charlotte, Louis, and Archie) were christened in the replica. Lilibet, the daughter of Prince Harry, is not thought to have worn the gown for her christening.

There are strict instructions governing the care of the gown, including that it be washed by hand with spring water after each use and stored in a dark room. These measures are intended to slow the garment's ageing process and preserve it for as long as possible. In her journal entry for 15 December 1875, the day of Princess Marie of Edinburgh's christening, Queen Victoria wrote of the gown's condition: "The Baby was dressed in the old Christening robe, which will hardly hold together!" At that time, the gown was 34 years old.

=== Replica gown ===
The 1841 gown was last used in 2004 at the christening of Lady Louise Mountbatten-Windsor, 163 years after its first use; Queen Elizabeth II subsequently decided that it had become too fragile for continued use and had it retired. She then commissioned her personal wardrobe adviser, Angela Kelly, to recreate the original gown. Craftsmen from both the United Kingdom and Italy were involved in the project to ensure that the new gown would be as close to the 1841 design as possible.

The replica gown was first used on 19 April 2008 at the christening of James, Earl of Wessex, and has remained in use ever since. Its most recent use was at the christening of Princess Beatrice's younger daughter, Athena Mapelli Mozzi, in 2025.

== Denmark ==
Danish royal christening gown
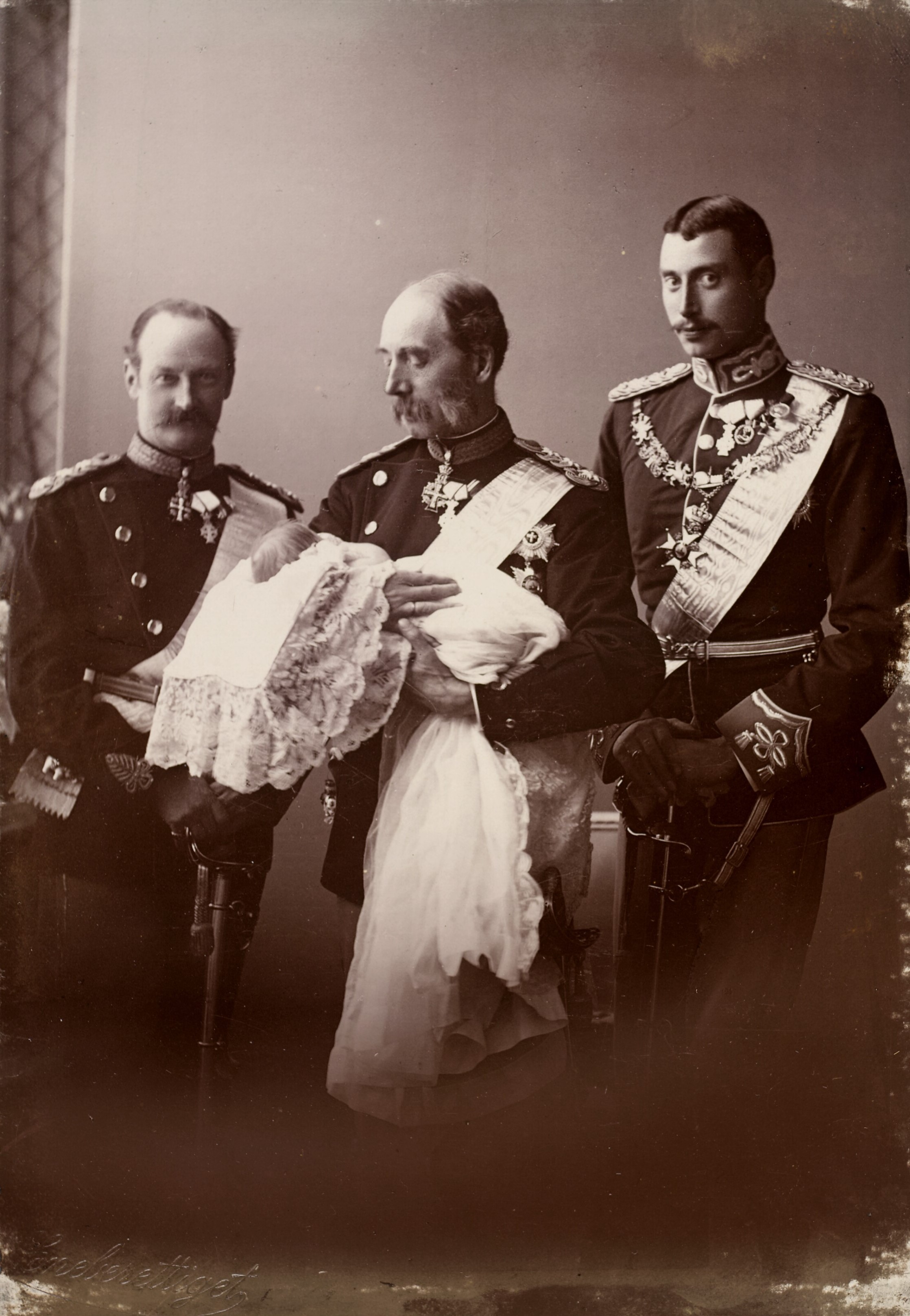
- Prince Frederik of Denmark wears the dåbskjole at his christening in 1899, held by his great-grandfather, Christian IX of Denmark.
- Year: 1870
- Type: Baptismal clothing
- Material: Brussels lace

The Dåbskjole (lit. christening gown) was first used in 1870 for the christening of Christian X of Denmark. This gown is made of Brussels lace, and was bought by Crown Princess Louise in Belgium for her eldest son's christening.

Four kings and two queens have been baptised in this gown:

Child christened	Life dates	Date and place of christening	Parents
Prince Christian of Denmark (latterly King Christian X of Denmark)	26 September 1870 — 20 April 1947	31 October 1870 — Christiansborg Palace	Crown Prince Frederik of Denmark — and — Princess Louisa of Sweden and Norway
Prince Carl of Denmark (latterly King Haakon VII of Norway)	3 August 1872 — 21 September 1957	7 September 1872 — Charlottenlund Palace	Crown Prince Frederik of Denmark — and — Princess Louisa of Sweden and Norway
Prince Frederick of Denmark (latterly King Frederik IX of Denmark)	11 March 1899 — 14 January 1972	9 April 1899 — Sorgenfri Palace	Prince Christian of Denmark — and — Duchess Alexandrine of Mecklenburg-Schwerin
Princess Margrethe of Denmark and Iceland (latterly Queen Margrethe II of Denmark)	16 April 1940 (age 86 years, 162 days old)	14 May 1940 — The Church of Holmen, Copenhagen	Crown Prince Frederick of Denmark and Iceland — and — Princess Ingrid of Sweden
Princess Anne-Marie of Denmark (latterly Queen Anne-Marie of Greece as the wife of King Constantine II of Greece)	30 August 1946 (age 80 years, 26 days old)	9 October 1946 — The Church of Holmen, Copenhagen	Crown Prince Frederick of Denmark and Iceland — and — Princess Ingrid of Sweden
Prince Frederik of Denmark (latterly King Frederik X of Denmark)	26 May 1968 (age 58 years, 122 days old)	24 June 1968 — The Church of Holmen, Copenhagen	Princess Margrethe of Denmark — and — Henri de Laborde de Monpezat

King Frederik X's heir apparent, Crown Prince Christian, has also been baptised in the gown. The gown was most recently used in 2012 for the christening of Crown Prince Frederik and Crown Princess Mary's son Prince Vincent. Rather than wearing the traditional family gown, Prince Joachim's children have worn gowns designed by Henrik Hviid, while Princess Josephine, Prince Vincent's twin sister, wore a gown found among Queen Ingrid's belongings.

== Netherlands ==
Dutch royal christening gown
- Princess Juliana wears the doopjurk in 1909. She is held by her mother, Queen Wilhelmina of the Netherlands.
- Designer: Anne Maria Schelfhout-Picnot
- Year: 1880
- Type: Baptismal clothing
- Material: Brussels lace

The doopjurk (lit. christening gown) is an item of clothing used by the Dutch royal family at every christening. The original gown was commissioned by Queen Emma for the christening of her daughter Princess Wilhelmina in 1880.

The Dutch gown has been worn by at least thirteen royal babies over 139 years, accounting for all monarchs since Wilhelmina and their children.

=== History ===
In the Netherlands, a christening was usually the first time a royal baby was introduced to the public. Before Wilhelmina's christening in 1880, the mother of the child was not usually present at the service. It was also rare that christenings were held outside of churches.

The gown was hand sewn by Anne Maria Schelfhout-Picnot, a clothing supplier to Queen Emma who specialized in infant clothing. Made of Brussels lace, the gown is decorated with floral motifs and the Dutch royal coat of arms. Four Dutch monarchs have been baptised in this gown:

Child christened	Life dates	Date and place of christening	Parents
Princess Wilhelmina of the Netherlands (latterly Queen Wilhelmina of the Netherlands)	31 August 1880 — 28 November 1962	12 October 1880 — The Hague	King William III — and — Princess Emma of Waldeck and Pyrmont
Princess Juliana of the Netherlands (latterly Queen Juliana of the Netherlands)	30 April 1909 — 20 March 2004	5 June 1909 — Het Loo Palace	Queen Wilhelmina — and — Duke Henry of Mecklenburg-Schwerin
Princess Beatrix of the Netherlands (latterly Queen Beatrix of the Netherlands)	31 January 1938 (age 88 years, 237 days old)	12 May 1938 — Great Church, The Hague	Princess Juliana of the Netherlands — and — Prince Bernhard of Lippe-Biesterfeld
Prince Willem-Alexander of the Netherlands (latterly King Willem-Alexander of the Netherlands)	27 April 1967 (age 59 years, 151 days old)	2 September 1967 — Great Church, The Hague	Princess Beatrix of the Netherlands — and — Claus van Amsberg

King Willem-Alexander's heir apparent, Catharina-Amalia, Princess of Orange, and his other two daughters, Princess Alexia and Princess Ariane, have also been baptised in this gown. The gown was most recently used at the christening of Princess Ariane in 2007.

=== The extended royal family ===
For other members of the Dutch royal house, such as Princess Margriet of the Netherlands and her family, christenings are private occasions, and most have taken place in the chapel of Het Loo Palace. It is also tradition that the baptism is conducted by the minister who officiated at the child's parents' wedding.

== Norway ==
Norway royal christening gown
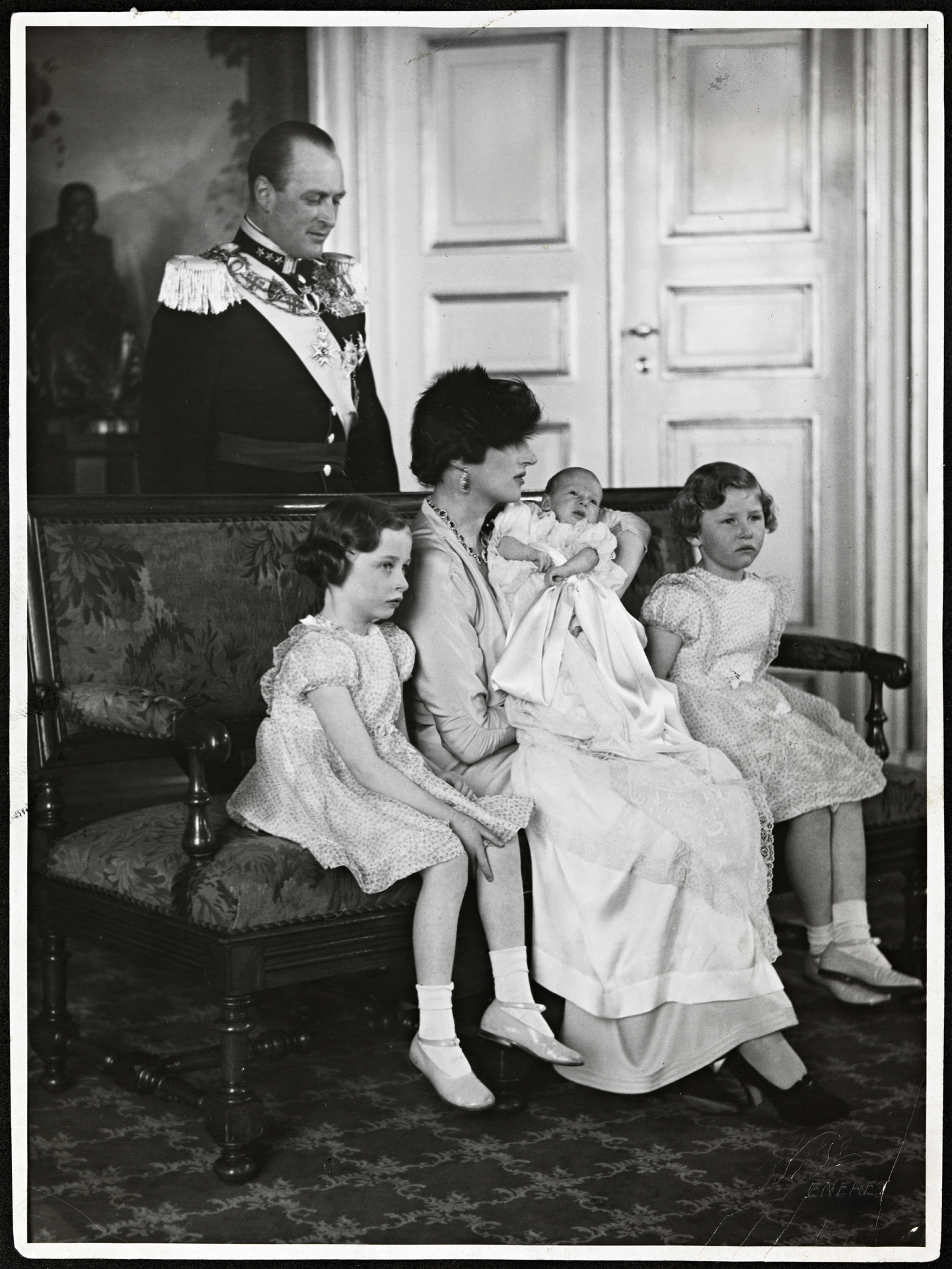
- King Harald V wearing the royal family's christening gown on 31 March 1937.
- Designer: Princess Ingeborg, Duchess of Västergötland
- Year: 1920
- Type: Baptismal clothing
- Material: Cotton and silk

In the Norwegian royal family, all babies since 1920, with the exception of Princess Ingrid Alexandra, have been baptised in a robe that was handmade in 1920 by Princess Ingeborg, Crown Princess Märtha of Norway's mother, and thus grandmother of the king, Harald. The robe's first wearer was Prince Georg of Denmark, one of Ingeborg's grandchildren, and has since been worn by many Norwegian royal children. The names of the babies are sewn in to the gown. Two Norwegian Kings were christened in this gown.

Crown Princess Ingrid Alexandra, who as of 2026 is first in line to the Norwegian throne, was baptised in the chapel of the Royal Palace in Oslo on 17 April 2004, wearing the same gown as her great-grandfather King Olav V had worn when he was baptised as Prince Alexander Edward Christian Frederik of Denmark at Sandringham in 1903. This gown had been purchased for him by his grandmother, Queen Alexandra of the United Kingdom.

=== Members of the Royal Family baptized in the 1920 christening gown ===
- 1930: Princess Ragnhild
- 1932: Princess Astrid
- 1937: Prince Harald (latterly King Harald V of Norway)
- 1971: Princess Märtha Louise
- 1973: Prince Haakon (now King Haakon VIII of Norway)
- 2003: Maud Angelica Behn
- 2005: Leah Isadora Behn
- 2006: Prince Sverre Magnus
- 2009: Emma Tallulah Behn

=== Members of the Royal Family baptized in the 1903 christening gown ===
- 1903: Prince Olav (latterly King Olav V of Norway)
- 2004: Princess Ingrid Alexandra

== Spain ==
Spanish royal christening gown
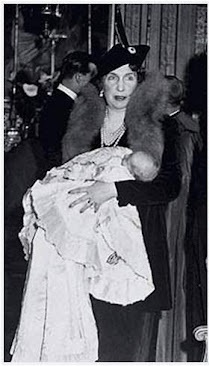
- King Juan Carlos I wears the dress at his baptism in 1938.
- Year: 1938
- Type: Baptismal clothing
- Material: Beige linen and satin

The faldón de cristianar (lit. baptismal gown), is the gown used by the Spanish royal family. It was first commissioned in 1938 by the then-exiled Infante Juan and Infanta María de las Mercedes of Spain for their son, Infante Juan Carlos.

This gown is made of beige linen, with satin ribbons and hand-embroidered lace.

=== History ===
The gown was first used for the christening of Juan Carlos I in 1938. At this time, the Spanish royal family were in exile in Rome during the Civil War, whilst Spain was under the dictatorship of Francisco Franco. The family were later permitted to return before Juan Carlos' installation as King of Spain, and the first use of the gown in Spain was for the christening of Infanta Elena, Duchess of Lugo in 1963.

Two Spanish monarchs have been christened in this gown:

Child christened	Life dates	Date and place of christening	Parents
Infante Juan Carlos of Spain (latterly King Juan Carlos I of Spain)	5 January 1938 (age 88 years, 263 days old)	26 January 1938 — Rome, Italy	Infante Juan of Spain — and — Princess María de las Mercedes of Bourbon-Two Sicilies
Infante Felipe of Spain (latterly King Felipe VI of Spain)	30 January 1968 (age 58 years, 238 days old)	8 February 1968 — Palace of Zarzuela, Madrid	Juan Carlos, Prince of Asturias — and — Princess Sophia of Greece and Denmark

The other members of the royal family baptised in this gown are:

- 1939: Infanta Margarita of Spain (latterly Infanta Margarita, Duchess of Soria and Duchess of Hermani)
- 1941: Infante Alfonso of Spain
- 1963: Infanta Elena of Spain (latterly Infanta Elena, Duchess of Lugo)
- 1965: Infanta Cristina of Spain
- 1998: Felipe de Marichalar y Borbón (son of Infanta Elena, Duchess of Lugo and Jaime de Marichalar)
- 1999: Juan Urdangarín y de Borbón (son of Infanta Cristina of Spain and Iñaki Urdangarin)
- 2000: Victoria de Marichalar y Borbón (daughter of Infanta Elena, Duchess of Lugo and Jaime de Marichalar)
- 2001: Pablo Urdangarín y de Borbón (son of Infanta Cristina of Spain and Iñaki Urdangarin)
- 2002: Miguel Urdangarín y de Borbón (son of Infanta Cristina of Spain and Iñaki Urdangarin)
- 2005: Irene Urdangarín y de Borbón (daughter of Infanta Cristina of Spain and Iñaki Urdangarin)
- 2006: Infanta Leonor of Spain (latterly Leonor, Princess of Asturias), current heir presumptive to the throne
- 2007: Infanta Sofía of Spain

== Sweden ==
Swedish royal christening gown
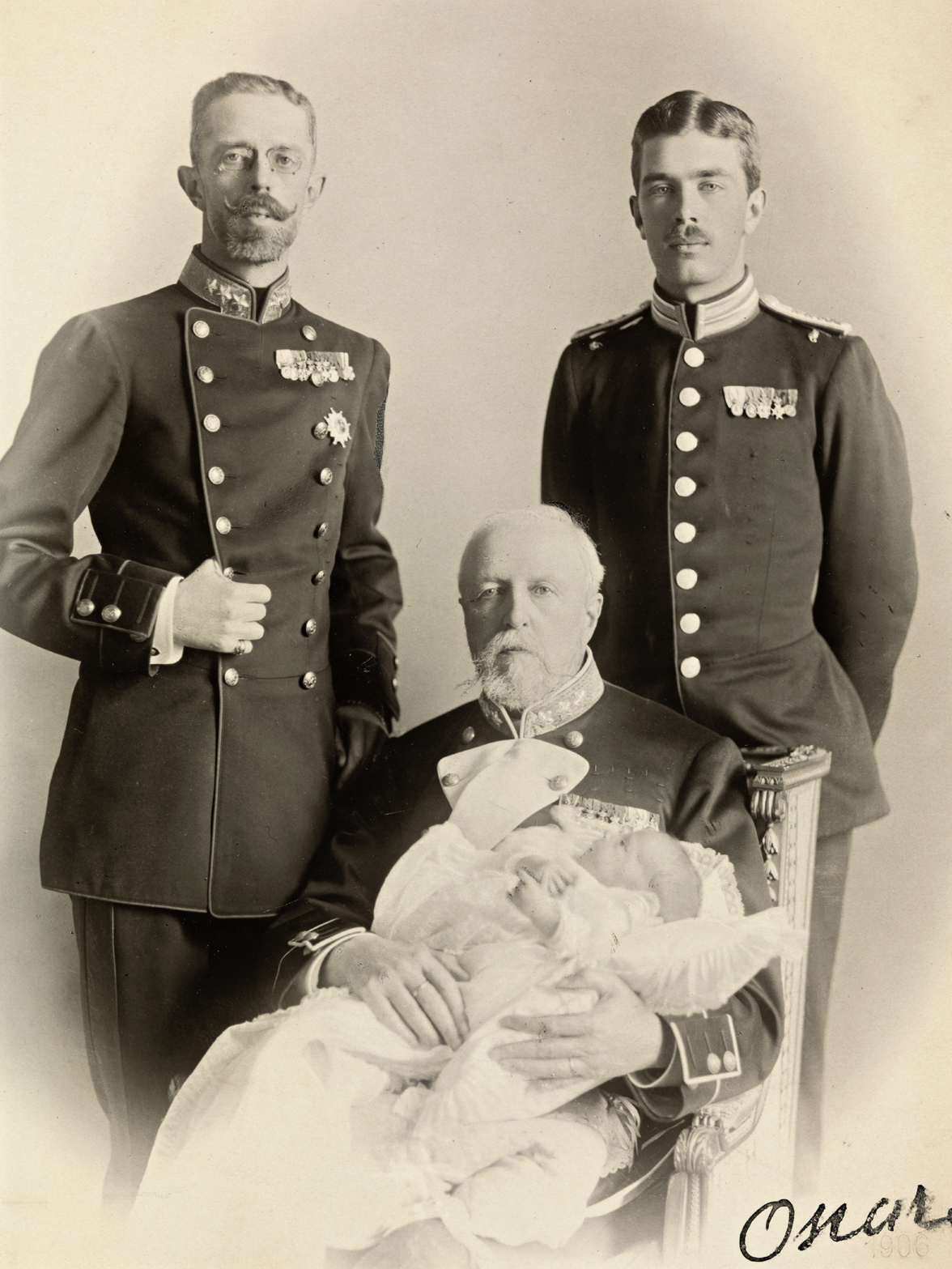
- Prince Gustaf Adolf wears the Swedish 'dopklänning' at his christening in 1906.
- Year: 1906
- Type: Baptismal clothing
- Material: Cotton batiste Valenciennes lace Silk

The Dopklänning (also lit. christening gown), has been in the Swedish royal family's use since the christening of Prince Gustaf Adolf, Duke of Västerbotten in 1906. This gown is made of cotton batiste and Valenciennes lace, with a silk undergarment.

At Princess Margaretha's christening in 1935, her parents, The Duke and Duchess of Västerbotten, commissioned a cream-colored cape and cap to be added to the gown. All the names and dates of the baptisms the gown has been used for since then have been embroidered into the cape.

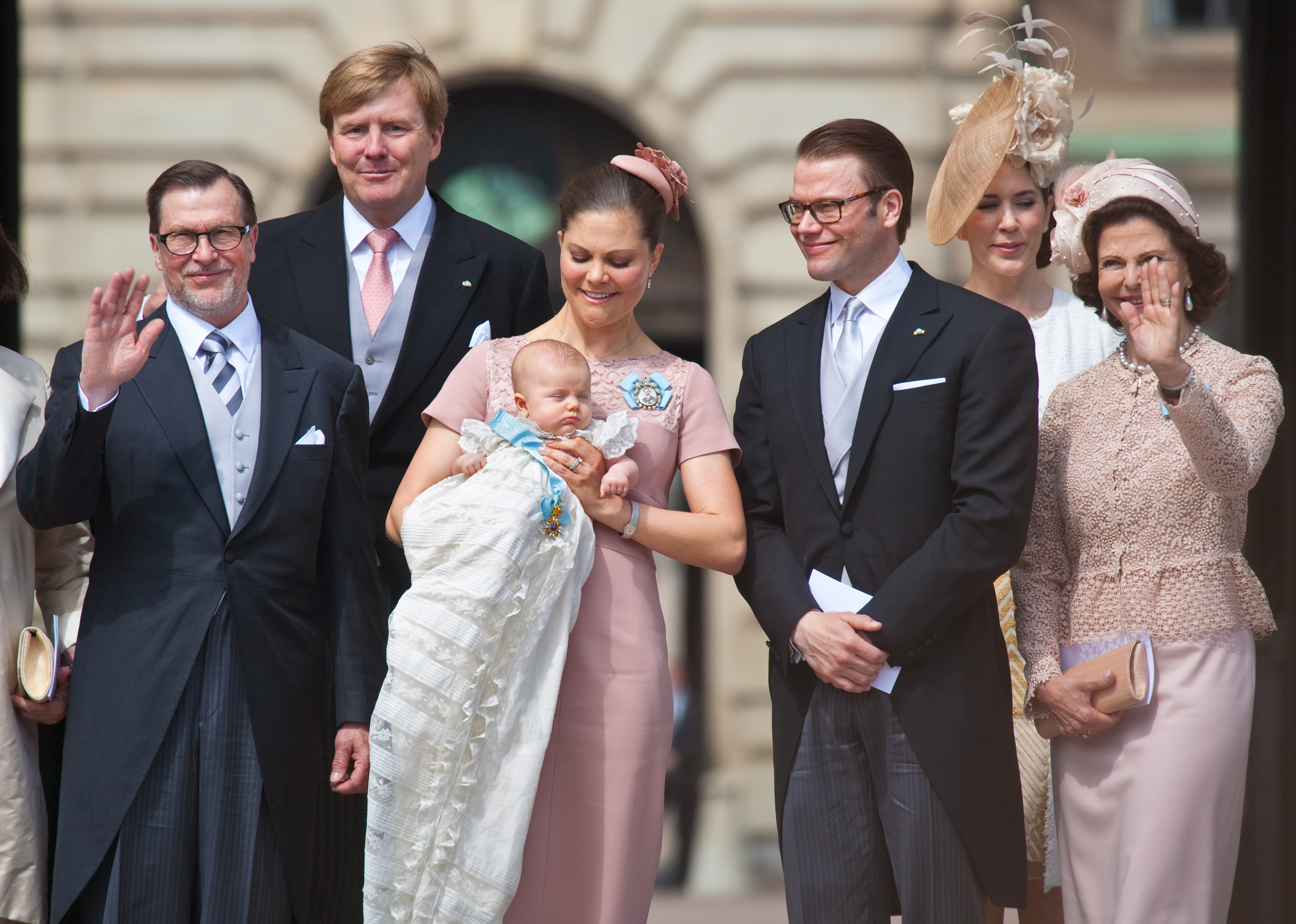
Christening of Princess Estelle in 2012.

One king and one queen have been christened in this gown:

Child christened	Life dates	Date and place of christening	Parents
Princess Ingrid of Sweden (latterly Queen Ingrid of Denmark as the wife of King Frederik IX of Denmark)	28 March 1910 — 7 November 2000	5 May 1910 — Slottskyrkan, Stockholm	Crown Prince Gustaf Adolf of Sweden — and — Princess Margaret of Connaught
Prince Carl Gustaf, Duke of Jämtland (latterly King Carl XVI Gustaf of Sweden)	30 April 1946 (age 80 years, 148 days old)	7 June 1946 — Slottskyrkan, Stockholm	Prince Gustaf Adolf, Duke of Västerbotten — and — Princess Sibylla of Saxe-Coburg and Gotha

The other royals baptised in this gown are:

- 1906: Prince Gustaf Adolf, Duke of Västerbotten
- 1907: Prince Sigvard, Duke of Uppland (latterly Sigvard Bernadotte, Count of Wisborg)
- 1909: Prince Lennart, Duke of Småland (latterly Lennart Bernadotte, Count of Wisborg)
- 1912: Prince Bertil, Duke of Halland
- 1916: Prince Carl Johan, Duke of Dalarna (latterly Carl Johan Bernadotte, Count of Wisborg)
- 1935: Princess Margaretha of Sweden
- 1937: Princess Birgitta of Sweden
- 1938: Princess Désirée of Sweden
- 1943: Princess Christina of Sweden
- 1977: Princess Victoria of Sweden (latterly Victoria, Crown Princess of Sweden and Duchess of Västergötland)
- 1979: Crown Prince Carl Philip (latterly Prince Carl Philip, Duke of Värmland)
- 1982: Princess Madeleine, Duchess of Hälsingland and Gästrikland
- 2012: Princess Estelle, Duchess of Östergötland
- 2014: Princess Leonore, Duchess of Gotland
- 2015: Prince Nicolas, Duke of Ångermanland
- 2016, 27 May: Prince Oscar, Duke of Skåne
- 2016, 11 October: Prince Alexander, Duke of Södermanland
- 2017: Prince Gabriel, Duke of Dalarna
- 2018: Princess Adrienne, Duchess of Blekinge
- 2021: Prince Julian, Duke of Halland
- 2025: Princess Ines, Duchess of Västerbotten

The gown has been worn by more than twenty royals over 110 years, and was most recently used at the christening of Prince Carl Philip's daughter, Princess Ines, in 2025.
