= Royal Baptismal Font (Denmark) =

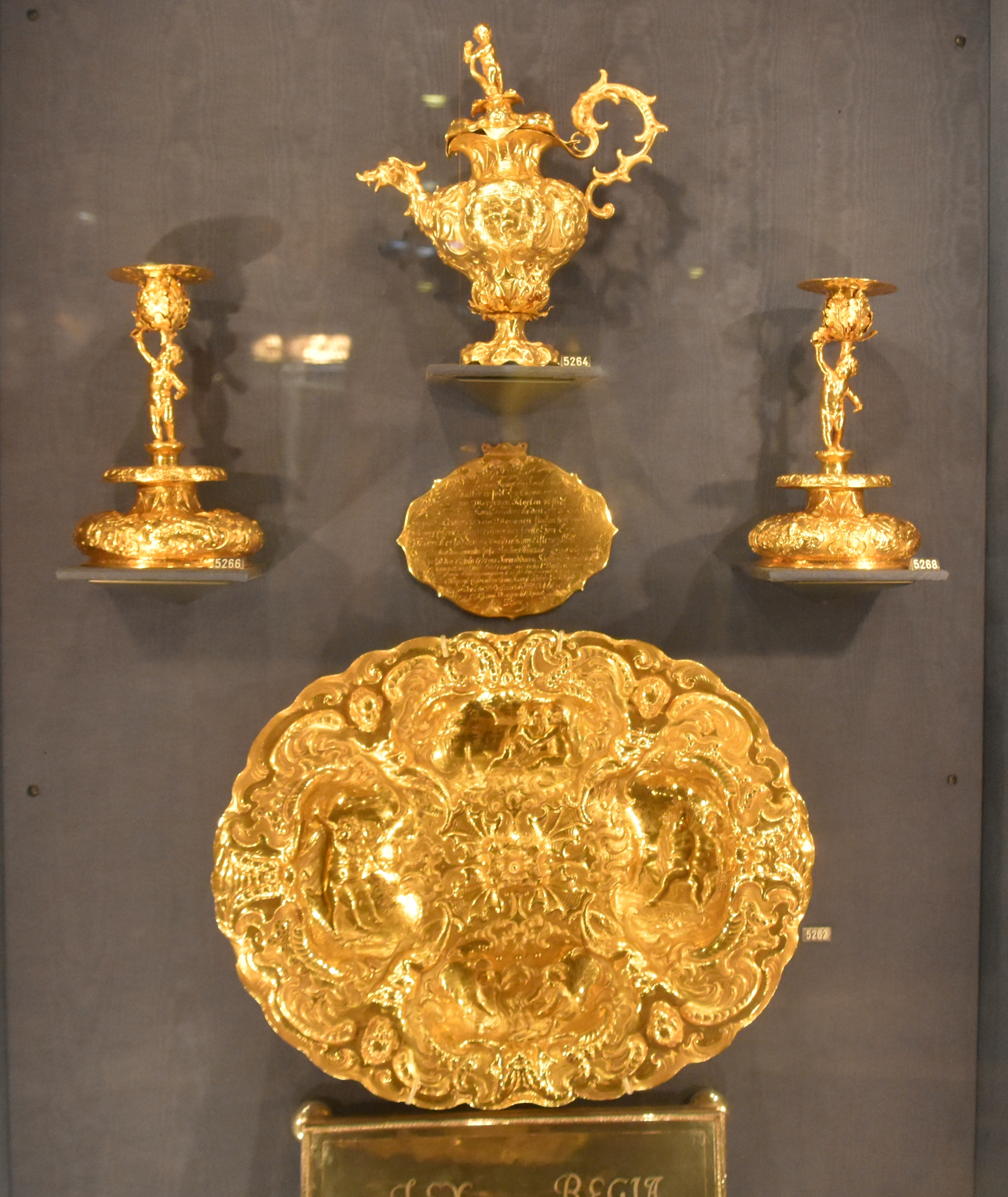
- The Royal Baptismal Font is used with the associated royal baptismal set, here on display at Rosenborg Castle in Copenhagen.
- Material: Silver, partly silver-gilt
- Created: c. 1660
- Present location: Rosenborg Castle

The Royal Baptismal Font (Danish: den kongelige døbefont), also known as the Rosenborg Baptismal Font (Danish: Rosenborg-døbefonten), is a silver and partly silver-gilt baptismal font used at the baptismal services of members of the Danish royal family since 1671. It is used together with the royal baptismal set made up by a basin, ewer and two candlesticks, all of solid gold. The baptismal font and baptismal set are part of the Royal Danish Collection and kept at Rosenborg Castle when not in use.

== Design ==
The Royal Baptismal Font was made by the silversmith Christian Mundt II in Hamburg and the foot by the silversmith Gödert Botstede around the year 1660. The font is made from solid silver and partly giltet to give the appearance of gold. The bottom has a relief of the baptism of Christ by John the Baptist.

The Royal Baptismal Font is used with the associated royal baptismal set, which consist of a basin, a ewer for baptismal water and two candlesticks, all of solid gold. Like the baptismal font, it is also from Hamburg, probably made by the goldsmith Hinrich Lambrecht II around the year 1650. Depicting the four seasons, the iconography of the basin lacks any religious meaning, indicating that the set was originally designed for another use than baptism.

== Use ==
The baptismal font has been used for the baptism of royal children in Denmark since 1671. Its first use was for the baptism of Crown Prince Frederick, the later King Frederick IV of Denmark, on 11 October 1671 at Copenhagen Castle. Its most recent use (by 2024) was at the baptism of Prince Joachim's youngest child, Princess Athena, on 20 May 2012 at Møgeltønder Church.

== See also ==
- Crown Jewels of Denmark
- Royal christening gown (Denmark)

== Bibliography ==
- Bartholdy, Nils G. (1999). "Kongelig fødsel og dåb siden enevælden" [Royal birth and baptism since the absolute monarchy]. Siden Saxo. 16th year (in Danish). IV. Danish National Archives.
- Hindø, Lone; Boelskifte, Else (2007). Kongelig Dåb. Fjorten generationer ved Rosenborg-døbefonten [Royal Baptisms. Fourteen generations at the Rosenborg baptismal font] (in Danish). Forlaget Hovedland. ISBN 978-87-7070-014-6.
