= Frederik X =

King of Denmark since 2024

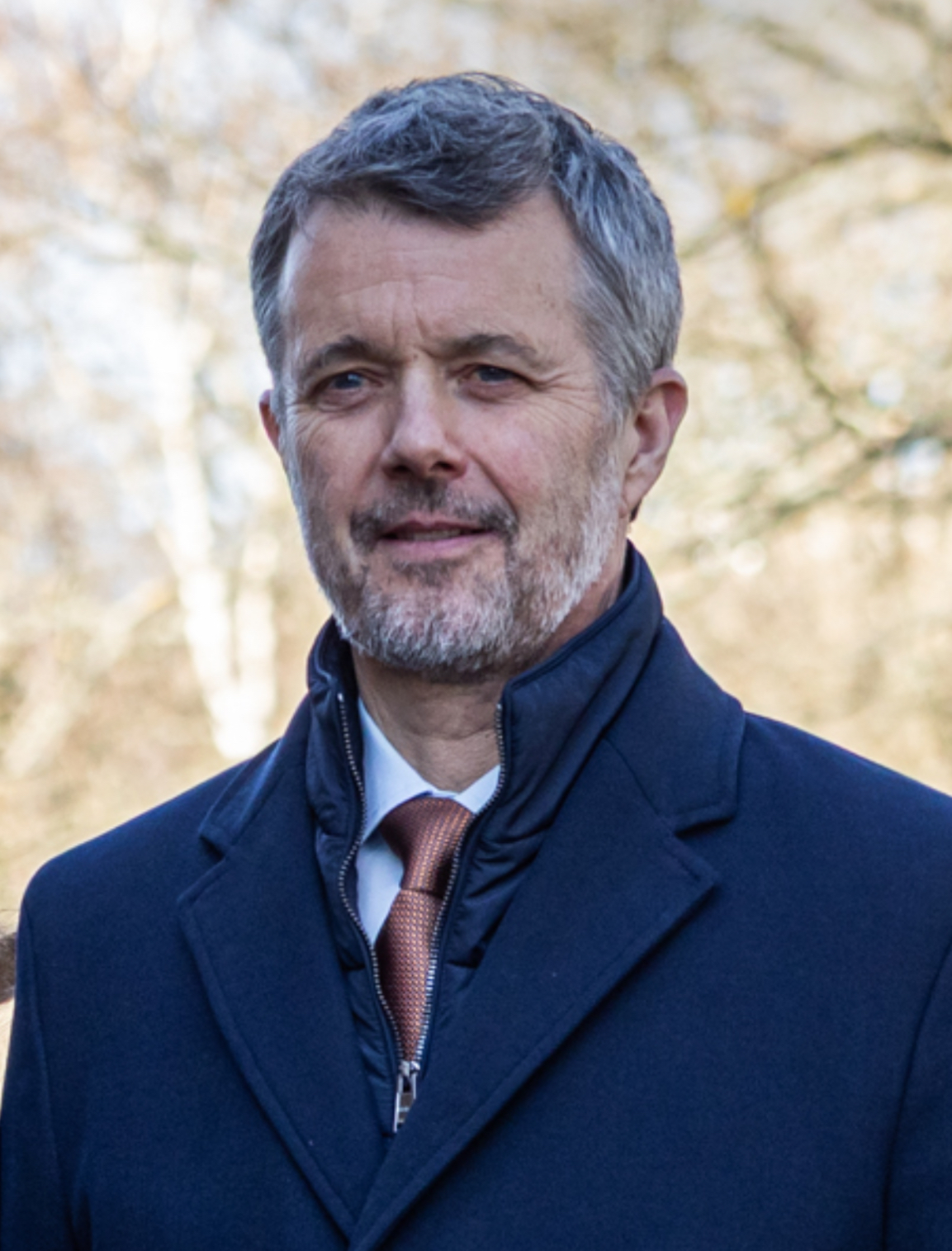
- Frederik in 2025

King of Denmark
- Reign: 14 January 2024 – present
- Predecessor: Margrethe II
- Heir apparent: Christian
- Born: 26 May 1968 (age 58); Rigshospitalet, Copenhagen, Denmark
- Spouse: Mary Donaldson (m. 2004)
- Issue: Crown Prince Christian; Princess Isabella; Prince Vincent; Princess Josephine
Names
- Frederik André Henrik Christian
- Father: Henri de Laborde de Monpezat
- Mother: Margrethe II
- Religion: Evangelical Lutheran (Note: As monarch, Frederik X is the de jure head of the Church of Denmark, per §4 of the Danish Constitution, although no formal authority is prescribed by law.)
- Other name: Pingo
- Education: Aarhus University
- Military career
- Allegiance: Denmark
- Branch: Royal Danish Army; Royal Danish Navy; Royal Danish Air Force
- Rank: General (Army); Admiral (Navy); General (Air Force)
- Unit: Frogman Corps

Frederik X (Note: Although uncommon, the anglicized "Frederick X" is still used by a small number of media outlets.) (Frederik André Henrik Christian, pronounced [ˈfʁeðˀʁek, ˈfʁæðˀʁæk]; born 26 May 1968) is King of Denmark, reigning since 14 January 2024.

Frederik is the elder son of Queen Margrethe II and Prince Henrik. He was born during the reign of his maternal grandfather, King Frederik IX, and became Crown Prince of Denmark following his mother's accession in 1972. He received his early education privately at home and later attended Krebs School, École des Roches, and Øregård Gymnasium. He earned a Master of Science degree in political science from Aarhus University. After university, he served in diplomatic posts at the United Nations and in Paris, and he has trained in all three branches of the Danish Armed Forces.

Frederik met Australian marketing consultant Mary Donaldson while attending the 2000 Summer Olympics in Sydney. They married on 14 May 2004 at Copenhagen Cathedral and have four children: Christian, Isabella, Vincent, and Josephine.

== Early life and education ==
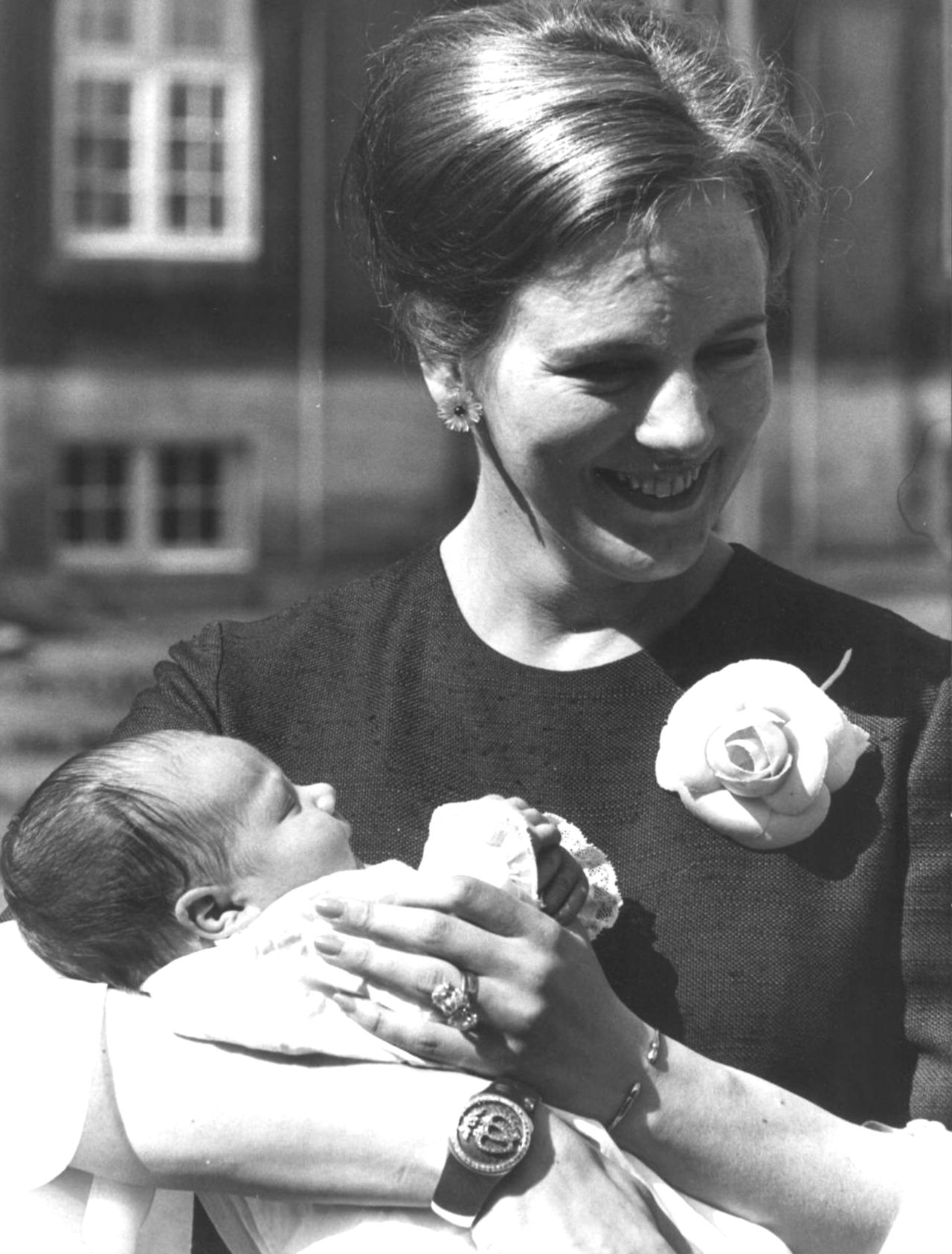
Prince Frederik as an infant in the arms of his mother, 1968

Frederik was born at 23:50 on 26 May 1968 by emergency caesarean section at Rigshospitalet, the Copenhagen University Hospital in Copenhagen, to the then Princess Margrethe (later Queen Margrethe II), oldest daughter of King Frederik IX and heir presumptive to the Danish throne, and Prince Henrik. At the time of his birth, his maternal grandfather was on the throne of Denmark, his maternal uncle-by-marriage and distant cousin Constantine II was king of Greece and his matrilineal great-grandfather, Gustaf VI Adolf, was on the throne of Sweden.

He was baptised on 24 June at Holmen Church in Copenhagen. He was named Frederik after his maternal grandfather, King Frederik IX, continuing the Danish royal tradition of the heir apparent being named either Frederik or Christian. (Note: His middle names honour his paternal grandfather, André de Laborde de Monpezat; his father, Prince Henrik; and his maternal great-grandfather, Christian X. Frederik's godparents were his maternal aunt, the Queen of the Hellenes; his paternal uncle, Count Etienne de Laborde de Monpezat; his extended relatives, Prince Georg of Denmark and Grand Duchess Joséphine-Charlotte of Luxembourg; and friends of his parents, Baron Christian de Watteville-Berckheim and Birgitta Juel Hillingsø.) He became Crown Prince of Denmark when his mother ascended the throne on 14 January 1972. Frederik's only sibling is Prince Joachim of Denmark.

Frederik attended primary school at Krebs' Skole between 1974 and 1981, as a private pupil at Amalienborg Palace from 1974 to 1976, and from the third form again at Krebs' Skole. From 1982 to 1983, he attended the École des Roches, a boarding school in Normandy, France. In 1986, Frederik graduated from Øregård Gymnasium. In addition to Danish, he is fluent in French (his father's language), English, and German.

In the autumn of 1989, Frederik began studying political science at Aarhus University. As part of his education, he spent the 1992–1993 academic year at Harvard University, where he studied political science under the name Frederik Henriksen. Whilst at Harvard, he participated in the Phoenix – SK Club, and lived in a rent-controlled apartment. Frederik is the first Danish royal to complete a university education.

== Early career ==
Frederik took up a position for three months with the Danish UN mission in New York in 1994. In 1995, he obtained his MSc degree in political science from Aarhus University. He completed the course in the prescribed number of years with an exam result above average, thus becoming the first royal to obtain a master's degree. His final paper was an analysis on the foreign policy of the Baltic States, which he had visited several times during his studies. The prince was posted as First Secretary to the Danish Embassy in Paris from October 1998 to October 1999.

== Military service ==
Frederik has completed extensive military studies and training in all three services, including training as a frogman in the naval elite special operations forces Frømandskorpset. It was there that he earned the nickname "Pingo", when his wetsuit filled with water and he was forced to waddle like a penguin.

In 2001 and 2002, he completed further leadership training at the Royal Danish Defence College. Frederik remained active in the defence services, and in the period 2002–2003 served as a staff officer at Defence Command Denmark, and from 2003 as a senior lecturer with the Institute of Strategy at the Royal Danish Defence College.

On 8 April 2015 he was named counter admiral in the Navy and major general in the Army and the Air Force. On 14 January 2024 with his accession as king, he was appointed grade four level, the highest military rank, as admiral in the Navy, general in the Army and general in the Air Force. By his appointment, Frederik has the same grade as the Danish Chief of Defence.

== Marriage and children ==
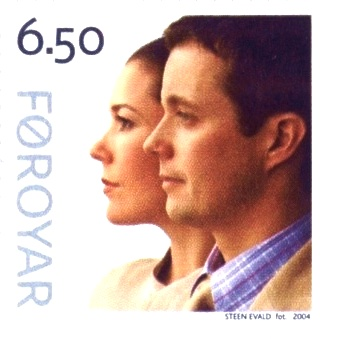
Prince Frederik and Princess Mary on a 2004 Faroese commemorative stamp

During a Council of State on 8 October 2003, Queen Margrethe gave her consent to the marriage of Crown Prince Frederik to Mary Elizabeth Donaldson, an Australian marketing consultant whom the prince had met while attending the Sydney Olympics in 2000. Their wedding took place on 14 May 2004 at Copenhagen Cathedral, Copenhagen.

The couple have four children: Christian (born 15 October 2005), Isabella (born 21 April 2007), and twins Vincent and Josephine (born 8 January 2011).

== Reign ==
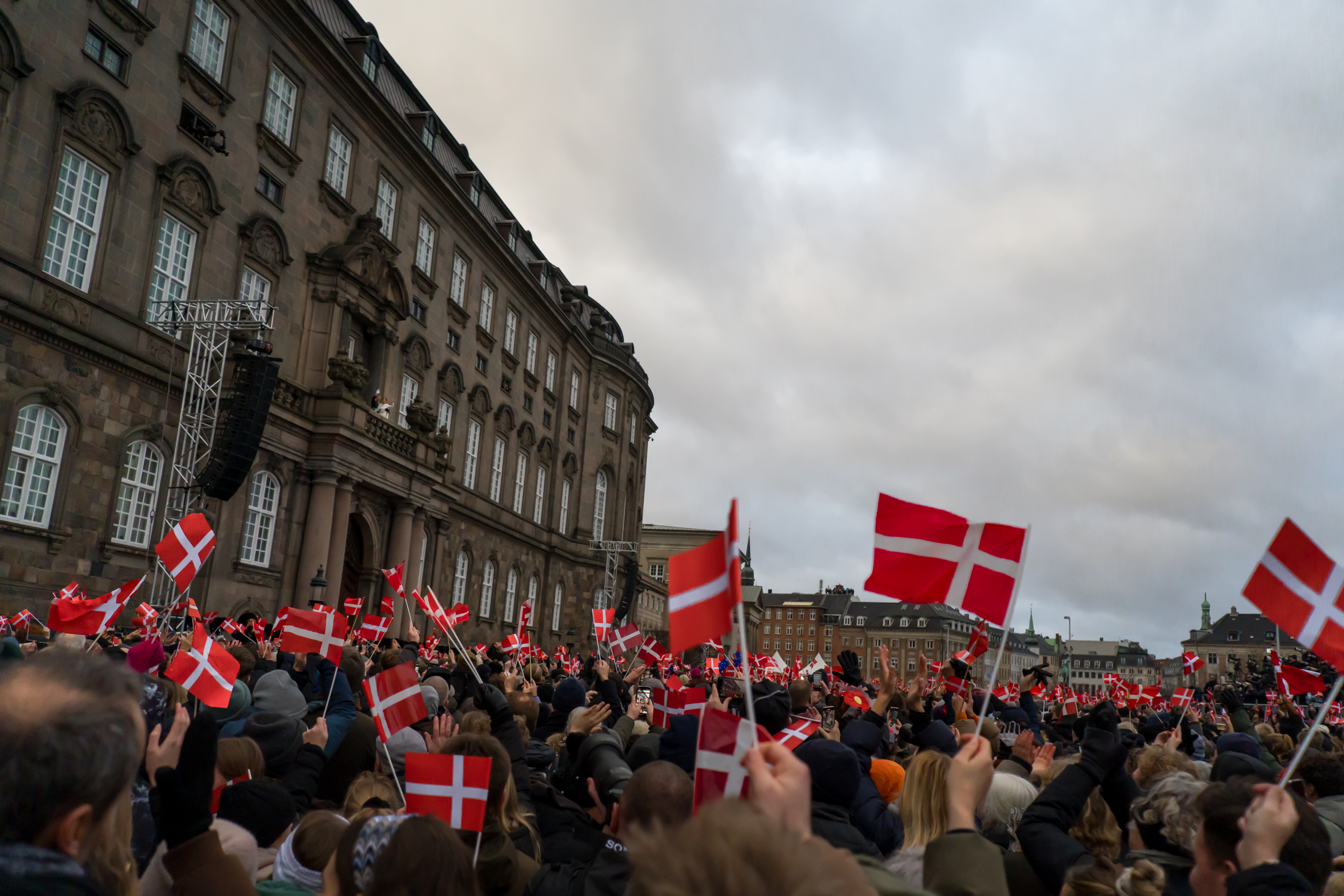
The proclamation of King Frederik X from the balcony of Christiansborg Palace on 14 January 2024

Queen Margrethe II announced her abdication during her annual live broadcast New Year's Eve address on 31 December 2023. Frederik succeeded her as King of Denmark on 14 January 2024, after Margrethe formally signed an instrument of abdication during a meeting of the Council of State.

After succeeding to the throne, he was proclaimed king from the balcony of Christiansborg Palace by Prime Minister Mette Frederiksen as has been the custom for Danish monarchs since the introduction of the constitutional monarchy in 1849. His motto is Forbundne, forpligtet, for Kongeriget Danmark (English: "United, committed, for the Kingdom of Denmark"), the first motto that does not mention God since Frederik VII.

On 15 January, the royal family appeared in Parliament for a ceremony marking the transition of head of state. On 21 January, the royal family attended a celebratory church service at Aarhus Cathedral, led by the Bishop of Aarhus and Royal Chaplain-in-Ordinary, Henrik Wigh-Poulsen.

On 31 January 2024, Frederik visited Poland and was received by its president Andrzej Duda, in his first overseas trip as monarch. Danish monarchs traditionally travel first to another Scandinavian country, but Frederik had planned the trip prior to Margrethe's abdication.

The King and Queen made their first state visits in May 2024, visiting Sweden and Norway. In June, they toured Greenland, one of the autonomous territories of the Kingdom of Denmark. Their planned tour of the Faroe Islands was postponed due to workers' strikes. The tour is now scheduled for 2025.

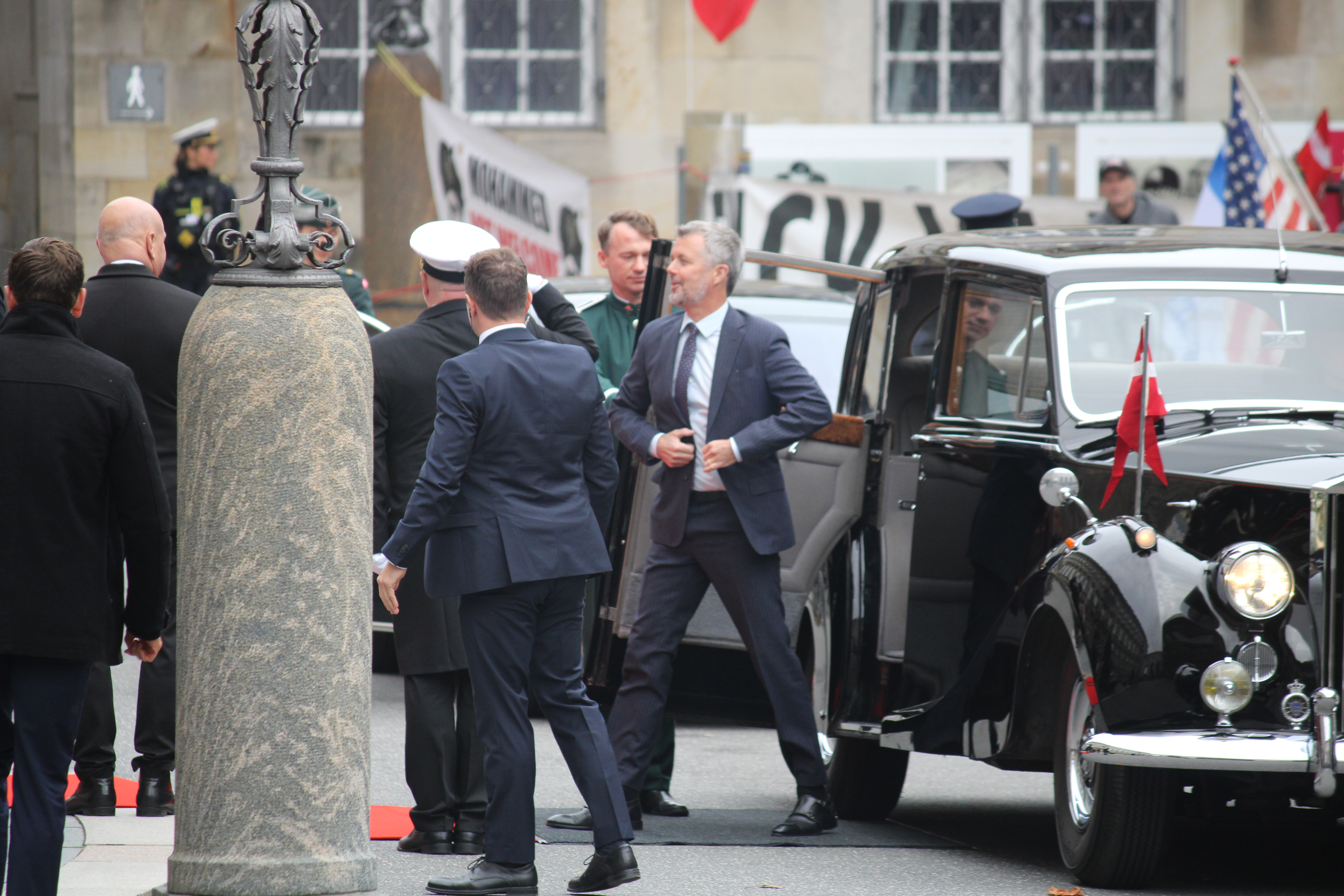
Frederik arriving to the 2025 opening of parliament

In November 2024 the Royal Court announced that the King had decided to phase out the system of granting companies royal warrants, which has been extant in Denmark since the 19th century. The motivation was that a system in which companies can claim special recognition from the royal house was not in keeping with the times. All warrants and similar titles are to be phased out by 31 December 2029.

In January 2025, when U.S president elect Donald Trump renewed talks about the intended U.S purchase of Greenland, the King made a speech promoting unity and collaboration within the Kingdom of Denmark. He also issued a royal decree to update the royal coat of arms from his mother's 1972 design. The changes included increasing the sizes of the symbols of Greenland and the Faroe Islands to make them more prominent. The new design “strengthens the prominence of the Commonwealth in the royal coat of arms,” according to a statement made by The Royal House on 1 January 2025.

=== State visits ===
No.	Month and year	Incoming	Outgoing
1	6–7 May 2024		Sweden; King Carl XVI Gustaf and Queen Silvia
2	14–15 May 2024		Norway; King Harald V and Queen Sonja
3	8–9 October 2024	Iceland; President Halla Tómasdóttir and husband Björn Skúlason	
4	6–7 December 2024	Egypt; President Abdel Fattah Al Sisi	
5	4–5 March 2025		Finland; President Alexander Stubb
6	31 March – 2 April 2025		France; President Emmanuel Macron
7	28–29 October 2025		Latvia; President Edgars Rinkēvičs
8	27–28 January 2026		Estonia; President Alar Karis
9	28–29 January 2026		Lithuania; President Gitanas Nausėda
10	14–19 March 2026		Australia; Governor-General Sam Mostyn
—	~~8–10 September 2026~~; Postponed to a later date due to the state funeral of King Harald V		Belgium; King Philippe I and Queen Mathilde
11	19–21 October 2026	Vietnam; President Tô Lâm and wife Ngô Phương Ly	

== Personal interests ==
=== Scientific research, climate change and sustainability ===
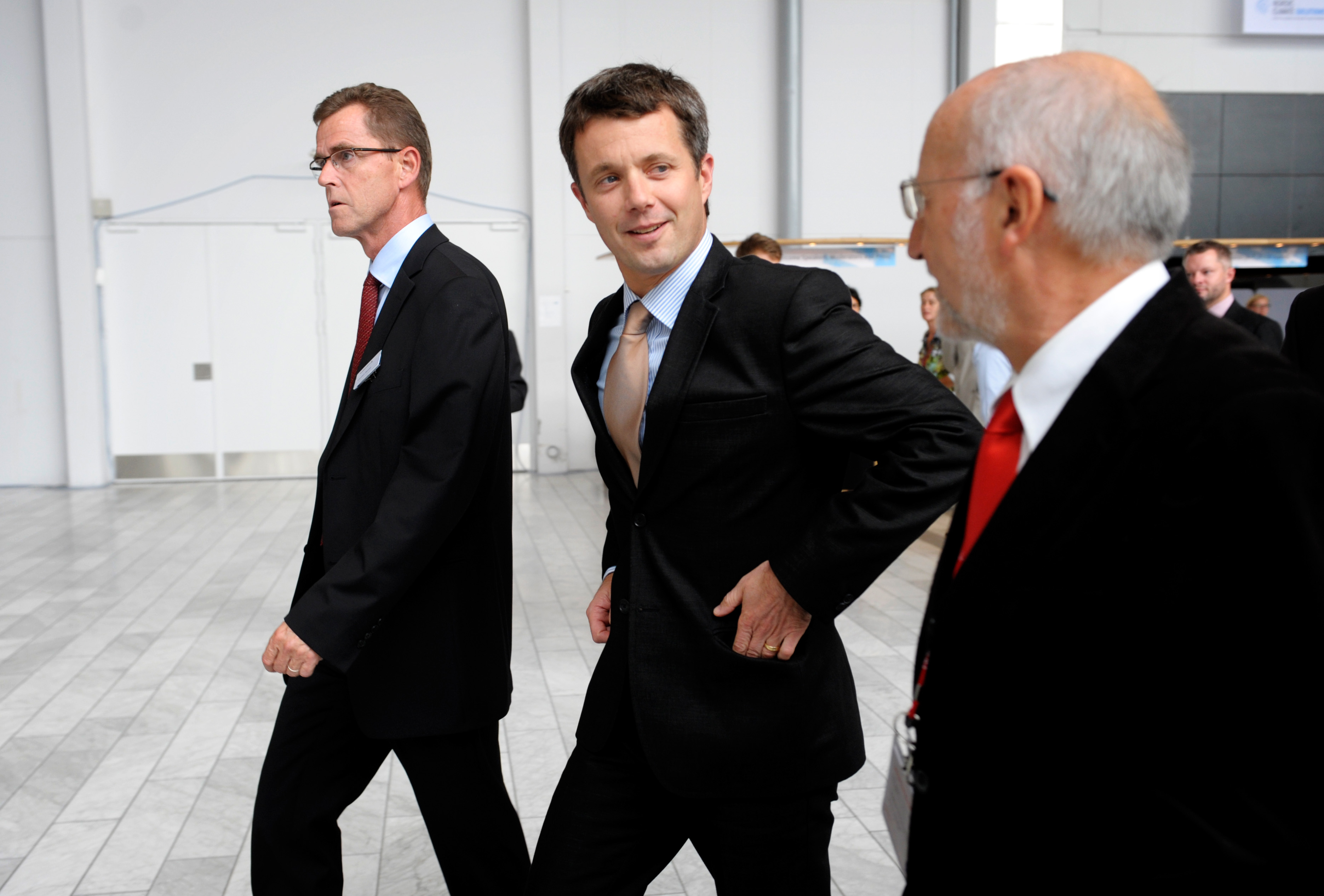
Prince Frederik arriving at Nordic Climate Solutions, 2009

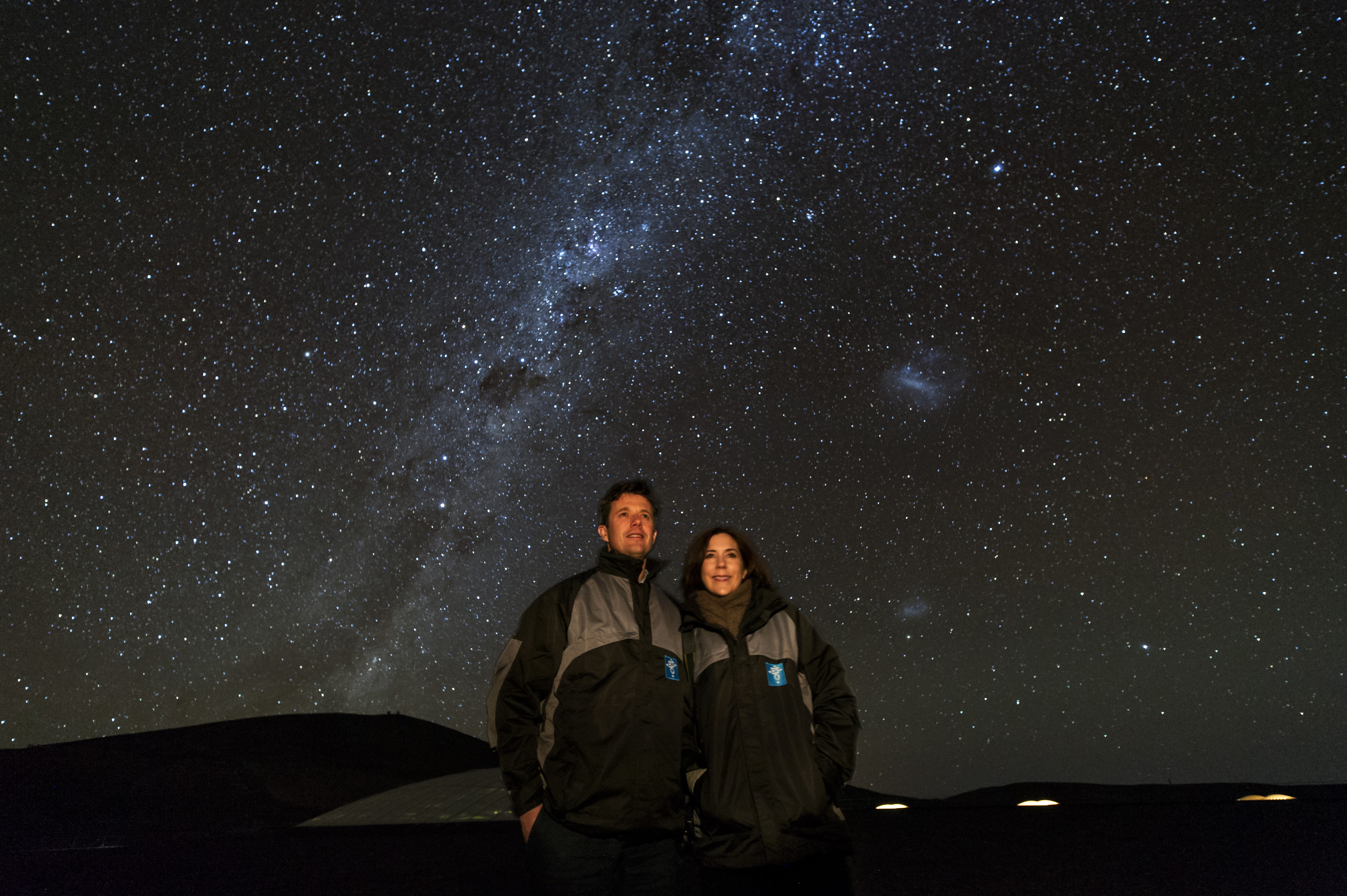
Prince Frederik and Princess Mary admire the night skies above ESO's Paranal Observatory in northern Chile, 2013

Frederik has a special interest in scientific research, climate change, and sustainability. For his commitment to sustainability, he was interviewed by the Financial Times and CNN International's Future Cities program. He participated in expeditions, forums and events on climate. The prince has represented Denmark as a promoter of sustainable Danish energy. The prince was one of the authors of the Kongelig Polartokt (Polar Cruise Royal), about the challenges of climate, published in 2009 with a preface written by Kofi Annan. In 2010, he wrote the foreword to the highschool textbook Naturen og klimaændringerne i Nordøstgrønland (Nature and climate change in Northeast Greenland). He supports scientific research projects, as a patron, as expeditionary, with regular attendance at events and through his foundation, Kronprins Frederiks Fond.

=== Sports and health ===
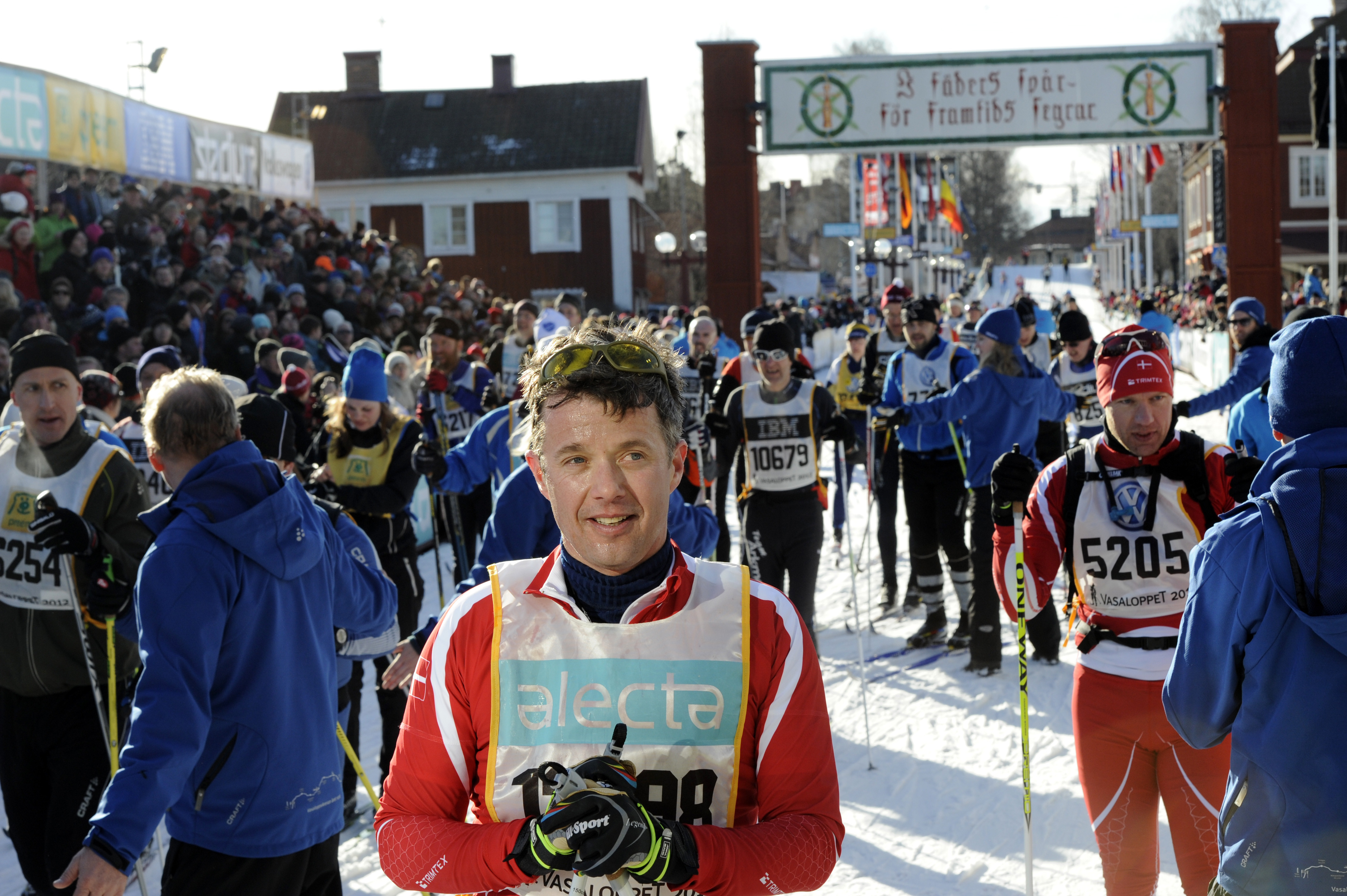
Prince Frederik after finishing the Vasaloppet 2012

The king encourages Danish participation in sports. He is a patron and honorary member of various sports organizations, and a former member of the International Olympic Committee. He also promotes an active lifestyle in society.

Frederik is an avid sportsman, running marathons in Copenhagen, New York, and Paris, and completing the 42 kilometers with a respectable time of 3 hours, 22 minutes and 50 seconds in the Copenhagen Marathon. In 2013, he completed the KMD Ironman Copenhagen in the time of 10:45:32 and is the first royal person to complete an Ironman.

Frederik is a keen sailor, being an accomplished Farr 40 and International Dragon skipper. At the 2003 Dragon European Championship, where 51 boats participated, the Prince and his crew had been leading after four out of six races; they finished in fourth place. At the 2008 Farr 40 World Championship with 33 boats participating, Frederik and his crew also took fourth place. Helming the Swan 60 yacht Emma, he won its IRC category in the 2010 Fyn Cup in Denmark, and was fourth in the 2011 Danish Dragon Championship with Nanoq. 27 boats participated.

In 2016, on the subject of the Olympics in Rio, Frederik told the press that he did not regret not chasing his dream to compete in the Olympics after meeting his wife. He had always thought about training and competing, but that would have required him to limit his activities and concentrate on training, instead, he put his energy into other aspects of life. In October 2016, Frederik had to cancel his appearance at the royal reception for the Danish Olympic and Paralympic athletes after he fractured his spine while jumping on a trampoline with his eldest son.

Frederik took part in the relay event during the 2019 IAAF World Cross Country Championships in Aarhus in March 2019.

Frederik has competed in cross-country skiing; he skied the 90 km (56 mi) Swedish Vasaloppet, the oldest cross-country ski race in the world, in 2012, 2013, 2014, and 2015. In 2016, he completed the 54 kilometres (34 mi) Norwegian Birkebeinerrennet with Norway's Crown Prince Haakon. Also in 2016, Frederik completed the 160 km (99 mi) Arctic Circle Race in Sisimiut, Greenland.

==== International Olympic Committee ====
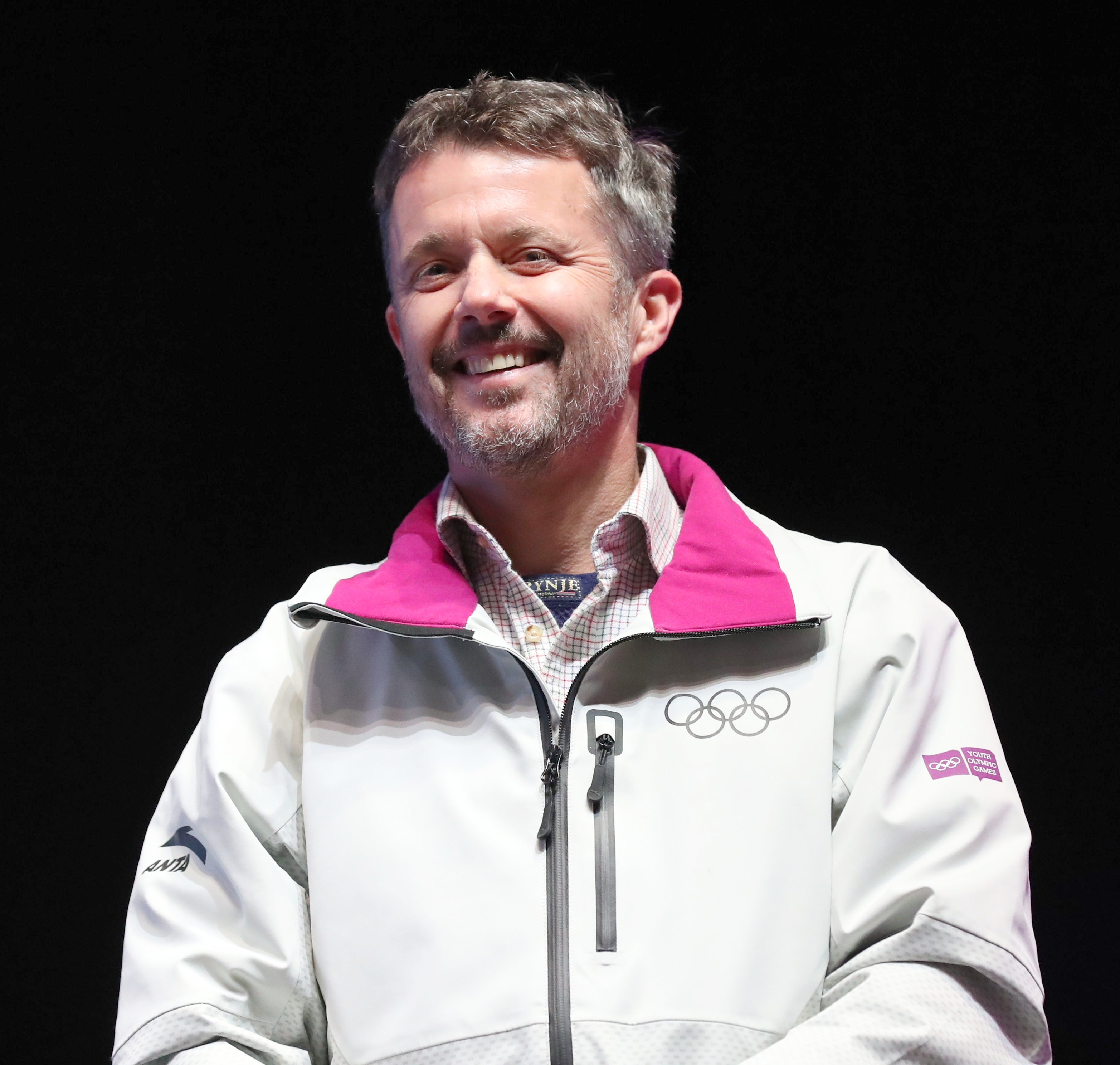
Prince Frederik as member of the International Olympic Committee, 2020

On 9 October 2009, Crown Prince Frederik was elected a member of the International Olympic Committee, replacing former Danish member Kaj Holm, who had reached the age of retirement. The Crown Prince's candidature was met with some skepticism in Denmark, as it would mean that the Crown Prince would be on a semi-political committee along with several people who are suspected or even convicted of criminal acts. Another concern was whether or not the Crown Prince's loyalty would be towards his country and government, as the Danish constitution prescribes, or with the International Olympic Committee, as is sworn upon election to the committee. The Crown Prince was given special observer status in National Olympic Committee and Sports Confederation of Denmark, as a way to allow him to work, without having political power.

Frederik announced that his point of focus and reason for joining the International Olympic Committee is to promote an active lifestyle among youth. He was elected for an eight-year term, and made it clear that he would terminate his membership upon ascending the Danish throne.

In 2012, Frederik carried the Olympic flame through Notting Hill, a neighbourhood in West London.

In 2016, Frederik faced criticism for voting against Danish Minister for Culture Bertel Haarder and a majority in the Danish Parliament's wishes on the subject of whether or not Russia should be allowed to compete at the 2016 Summer Olympics following allegations of state-sponsored doping.

On 19 June 2017, the Crown Prince announced that he would continue another term of 8 years. However, in 2021, Frederik was announced that he would step down as an active member of the International Olympic Committee at the committee's annual session prior to the 2020 Summer Olympics, citing a wish to intensify his everyday work as the reason for stepping down in the middle of his term.

==== Royal Run ====
In celebration of his 50th birthday, on 21 May 2018, Frederik initiated a public running event across five cities in Denmark called Royal Run with more than 70,000 participants, including himself and his own family. The event was generally deemed as "exceeding expectations" by the public.

The event has since become annual, and was continued in 2019, 2021, 2022, and 2023. The 2020 edition was cancelled due to the COVID-19 situation in Denmark. The 2024 edition took place on 20 May in Copenhagen/Frederiksberg, Kalundborg, Fredericia, Aarhus, and Brønderslev. The 2025 edition took place on 9 June 2025.

=== Expeditions ===
The Crown Prince participated in an expedition to Mongolia in 1986. In 2000, he participated in "Expedition Sirius 2000", a four-month and 2,795 km dog-sled expedition in the northern part of Greenland. The expedition Sirius marked the 50-year anniversary of the Sirius Patrol. Prince Frederik was part of the polar expedition as a film photographer, whose job was to ensure an optimal coverage of this event.

=== Social endeavours ===
When younger, he was known to have pursued a life of fast cars and fast living, regularly seen frequenting nightclubs alongside celebrities. He played harmonica at a friend's rock concert, and was sighted at Burning Man as late as 2014.

== Crown Prince Frederik's Foundation ==
The purpose of the foundation is to provide financial assistance to students of social policy and sciences, for one year's study at Harvard. It also provides financial support for scientific expeditions, particularly to foreign parts of the world, such as Greenland and the Faroe Islands, and sports purposes, including those with a particularly social aspect.

== Titles, styles, honours and arms ==
=== Titles and styles ===
Until his mother's accession to the throne, Frederik was styled "His Royal Highness Prince Frederik of Denmark"; at that point, he became known as "His Royal Highness The Crown Prince of Denmark". When Margrethe II created the title count of Monpezat for her male-line descendants on 29 April 2008, Frederik became known as "His Royal Highness The Crown Prince of Denmark, Count of Monpezat". Since his accession, he has been styled "His Majesty The King, Count of Monpezat".

=== Honours ===
The King has received a number of honours. One of the more surprising honours he has received is the special honour from the Danish Red Cross. Normally, this accolade is only given to former presidents of the Danish Red Cross, but a special exception was made for the king on this occasion.

==== National honours ====
===== Orders and appointments =====
- 14 January 2024 – present: Sovereign of the Order of the Elephant
  - 14 January 1972 – 14 January 2024: Knight of the Order of the Elephant (R.E.)
- 14 January 2024 – present: Grand Master of the Order of the Dannebrog
  - 1 January 2004 – 14 January 2024: Grand Commander of the Order of the Dannebrog (S.Kmd)

===== Medals and decorations =====
- Recipient of the Cross of Honour of the Order of the Dannebrog
- Recipient of the Golden Jubilee Medal of Queen Margrethe II
- Recipient of the 80th Birthday Medal of Queen Margrethe II
- Recipient of the Prince Henrik's Commemorative Medal
- Recipient of the Golden Anniversary Medal of Queen Margrethe II and Prince Henrik
- Recipient of the 75th Birthday Medal of Queen Margrethe II
- Recipient of the Ruby Jubilee Medal of Queen Margrethe II
- Recipient of the 70th Birthday Medal of Queen Margrethe II
- Recipient of the 75th Birthday Medal of Prince Henrik
- Recipient of the Silver Jubilee Medal of Queen Margrethe II
- Recipient of the Silver Anniversary Medal of Queen Margrethe II and Prince Henrik
- Recipient of the 100th Anniversary Medal of the Birth of King Frederik IX
- Recipient of the Queen Ingrid Commemorative Medal
- Recipient of the 50th Anniversary Medal of the arrival of Queen Ingrid to Denmark
- Recipient of the Royal Medal of Recompense, Silver Medal with Crown
- Recipient of the Naval Long Service Medal
- Recipient of the Homeguard Medal of Merit
- Recipient of the Medal of Honour of the Reserve Officers League
- Recipient of the Nordic Blue Berets Medal of Honour in gold
- Recipient of the Danish Red Cross Badge of Honor
- Recipient of the Military Athletic Medal of Honour
Greenland: Recipient of the Nersornaat Medal for Meritorious Service, 1st Class

==== Foreign honours ====
- Belgium: Grand Cordon of the Order of Leopold
- Brazil:
  - Grand Cross of the National Order of the Southern Cross
  - Grand Cross of the Order of Rio Branco
- Bulgaria: First Class of the Order of the Balkan Mountains
- Chile: Grand Cross of the Order of Merit
- Egypt: Collar of the Order of the Nile
- Estonia:
  - Grand Cross of the Order of the Cross of Terra Mariana
  - Collar of the Order of the Cross of Terra Mariana
- Finland: Commander Grand Cross with Collar of the Order of the White Rose of Finland
- France:
  - Grand Cross of the National Order of the Legion of Honour
  - Grand Cross of the National Order of Merit
- Germany: Grand Cross, 1st Class of the Order of Merit of the Federal Republic of Germany
- Greece: Grand Cross of the Order of Honour
- Iceland: Grand Cross of the Order of the Falcon
- Italy: Knight Grand Cross of the Order of Merit of the Italian Republic
- Japan: Grand Cordon of the Supreme Order of the Chrysanthemum
- Jordan: Grand Cordon of the Supreme Order of the Renaissance
- Latvia:
  - Commander Grand Cross of the Order of the Three Stars
  - Grand Cross with swords of the Order of Viesturs
- Lithuania: Grand Cross with Golden Chain of the Order of Vytautas the Great (28 January 2026)
- Luxembourg: Grand Cross of the Order of Civil and Military Merit of Adolph of Nassau
- (Kingdom of Nepal) Nepali Royal Family: Member of the Royal Order of Ojaswi Rajanya
- Mexico: Grand Cross, Special Class of the Mexican Order of the Aztec Eagle
- Netherlands:
  - Knight Grand Cross of the Order of the Lion of the Netherlands
  - Recipient of the King Willem-Alexander Inauguration Medal
- Norway: Grand Cross with Collar of the Royal Norwegian Order of Saint Olav
- Romania: Grand Cross of the Order of the Star of Romania
- Spain: Knight Grand Cross of the Royal Order of Isabella the Catholic
- Sweden:
  - Knight with Collar of the Royal Order of the Seraphim
  - Recipient of the 70th Birthday Medal of King Carl XVI Gustaf
  - Recipient of the King Carl XVI Gustaf Golden Jubilee Medal
- Thailand: Knight Grand Cross of the Most Illustrious Order of Chula Chom Klao

=== Personal symbols ===
Royal coat of arms

Royal standard

Royal monogram as king

Personal monogram as crown prince

Dual monogram of Frederik and Mary

== See also ==
- List of current monarchs of sovereign states
- Crown Prince Frederik Land – area in the northernmost part of Greenland named after King Frederik X
- Royal Household of Denmark – Royal officials and supporting staff

Frederik X House of Glücksburg Cadet branch of the House of Oldenburg Born: 26 May 1968
Regnal titles
Preceded by Margrethe II	King of Denmark; 14 January 2024 – present	Incumbent; Heir apparent: Christian
Danish royalty
Preceded by Margrethe as Hereditary Princess of Denmark	Crown Prince of Denmark; 1972–2024	Succeeded by Christian
