= List of princes of Denmark =

This is a list of Danish princes from the establishment of hereditary monarchy by Frederick III in 1648. Individuals holding the title of prince would usually also be styled "His Royal Highness" (HRH) or "His Highness" (HH).

== List of Danish princes since 1648 ==
Not a Danish prince by birth but created a prince of Denmark
Lost title due to unequal marriage
Also a prince of England, Scotland and Ireland by birth.

List of Danish Princes
Name	Born	Died	Arms	Royal lineage	Notes
Christian later, Christian V	1646	1699		Son of Frederick III and Sophie Amalie of Brunswick-Lüneburg	Reigned 1670–1699. Married Charlotte Amalie of Hesse-Kassel on 25 June 1667.
Frederick	1651	1652		Son of Frederick III and Sophie Amalie of Brunswick-Lüneburg	Died in infancy.
George	1653	1708		Son of Frederick III and Sophie Amalie of Brunswick-Lüneburg	Consort of the British monarch from 1702 to 1708. Created Duke of Cumberland by his brother-in-law, William III, King of England, Scotland and Ireland. Married Anne, Queen of Great Britain on 28 July 1683.
Frederick later, Frederick IV	1671	1730		Son of Christian V and Charlotte Amalie of Hesse-Kassel	Reigned 1699–1730. First Marriage Louise of Mecklenburg-Güstrow on 5 December 1695, widowed in 1721. Married a second time morganatically by bigamy Elisabeth Helene von Vieregg in 1703, widowed in 1704. Married a third time morganatically by bigamy Anne Sophie von Reventlow in 1712, and again non-morganatically on 4 April 1721.
Christian Vilhelm	1672	1673		Son of Christian V and Charlotte Amalie of Hesse-Kassel	Died in infancy.
Christian	1675	1695		Son of Christian V and Charlotte Amalie of Hesse-Kassel	Died unmarried.
Charles	1680	1729		Son of Christian V and Charlotte Amalie of Hesse-Kassel	Died unmarried.
William	1687	1705		Son of Christian V and Charlotte Amalie of Hesse-Kassel	Died unmarried.
William Henry	1689	1700		Grandson of Frederick III and Sophie Amalie of Brunswick-Lüneburg	Also a prince of England, Scotland and Ireland by birth. Created Duke of Gloucester at his christening by his maternal uncle, William III, King of England, Scotland and Ireland. Died unmarried.
George	1692	1692		Grandson of Frederick III and Sophie Amalie of Brunswick-Lüneburg	Also a prince of England, Scotland and Ireland by birth Died in infancy.
Christian	1697	1698		Son of Frederick IV and Louise of Mecklenburg-Güstrow	Died in infancy.
Christian later, Christian VI	1699	1746		Son of Frederick IV and Louise of Mecklenburg-Güstrow	Reigned 1730–1746. Married Sophie Magdalene of Brandenburg-Kulmbach on 7 August 1721.
Frederik Charles	1701	1702		Son of Frederick IV and Louise of Mecklenburg-Güstrow	Died in infancy.
George	1703	1704		Son of Frederick IV and Louise of Mecklenburg-Güstrow	Died in infancy.
Frederik Christian	1726	1727		Son of Frederick IV and Anne Sophie Reventlow	Died in infancy.
Charles	1728	1729		Son of Frederick IV and Anne Sophie Reventlow	Died in infancy.
Frederick later, Frederick V	1723	1766		Son of Christian VI and Sophie Magdalene of Brandenburg-Kulmbach	Reigned 1746–1766. First Marriage Louise of Great Britain on 11 December 1743, widowed in 1751. Second Marriage Juliana Maria of Brunswick-Wolfenbüttel on 8 July 1752.
Christian	1745	1747		Son of Frederick V and Louise of Great Britain	Died in infancy.
Christian later, Christian VII	1749	1808		Son of Frederick V and Louise of Great Britain	Reigned 1766–1808. Married Caroline Matilda of Great Britain on 8 November 1766, divorced in 1772.
Frederick	1753	1805		Son of Frederick V and Juliana Maria of Brunswick-Wolfenbüttel	Regent of the Kingdom from 1772 to 1784. Heir presumptive 1766–1768. Married Sophia Frederica of Mecklenburg-Schwerin on 21 October 1774.
Frederick later, Frederick VI	1768	1839		Son of Christian VII	Reigned 1808–1839. Married Marie of Hesse-Kassel on 31 July 1790.
Christian Frederick later, Christian VIII	1786	1848		Grandson of Frederick V and Juliana Maria of Brunswick-Wolfenbüttel	Reigned 1839–1848. First Marriage Charlotte Frederica of Mecklenburg-Schwerin on 21 June 1806, divorced in 1810. Second Marriage Caroline Amalie of Schleswig-Holstein-Sonderburg-Augustenburg on 22 May 1815
Frederick Ferdinand	1792	1863		Grandson of Frederick V and Juliana Maria of Brunswick-Wolfenbüttel	Heir presumptive from 1848 until his death. Married Caroline of Denmark on 1 August 1829.
Christian	1791	1791		Son of Frederick VI and Marie of Hesse-Kassel	Died in infancy.
Christian	1797	1797		Son of Frederick VI and Marie of Hesse-Kassel	Died in infancy.
Frederik Carl Christian later, Frederick VII	1808	1863		Son of Christian VIII and Charlotte Frederica of Mecklenburg-Schwerin	Reigned 1848–1863. First Marriage Vilhelmine Marie of Denmark on 1 November 1828, divorced in 1837. Second Marriage Caroline Mariane of Mecklenburg on 10 June 1841, divorced in 1846. Married a third time morganatically Louise Rasmussen on 8 August 1850.
Christian later, Christian IX	1818	1906		Great-grandson of Frederick V and Louise of Great Britain	Reigned 1863–1906. Born a prince of Schleswig-Holstein-Sonderburg-Beck later created a prince of Schleswig-Holstein-Sonderburg-Glücksburg, and finally a prince of Denmark in 1853. Married Louise of Hesse-Kassel on 26 May 1842, widowed in 1898.
Christian Frederik Vilhelm Carl later, Frederik VIII	1843	1912		Son of Christian IX and Louise of Hesse-Kassel	Reigned 1906–1912. Married Louise of Sweden on 28 July 1869.
Vilhelm later, George I, King of the Hellenes	1845	1913		Son of Christian IX and Louise of Hesse-Kassel	Elected King of the Hellenes in 1863. Married Olga Constantinovna of Russia on 27 October 1867.
Valdemar	1858	1939		Son of Christian IX and Louise of Hesse-Kassel	Married Marie of Orléans on 20 October 1885, widowed in 1909.
Christian Carl Frederik Albert Alexander Vilhelm later, Christian X	1870	1947		Son of Frederik VIII and Louise of Sweden	Reigned 1912–1947. King of Iceland 1918–1944. Married Alexandrine of Mecklenburg-Schwerin on 26 April 1898.
Christian Frederik Carl Georg Valdemar Axel later, Haakon VII, King of Norway	1872	1957		Son of Frederik VIII and Louise of Sweden	Elected King of Norway in 1905. Married Maud of Wales on 22 July 1896, widowed in 1938.
Harald Christian Frederik	1876	1949		Son of Frederik VIII and Louise of Sweden	Married Helena Adelaide of Schleswig-Holstein-Sonderburg-Glücksburg on 28 April 1909.
Christian Frederik Vilhelm Valdemar Gustav	1887	1944		Son of Frederik VIII and Louise of Sweden	Died unmarried.
Constantinelater, Constantine, King of the Hellenes	1868	1923		Grandson of Christian IX and Louise of Hesse-Kassel	Also a prince of Greece by birth. King of the Hellenes from 1913 to 1917, and again 1920–1922. Married Sophia of Prussia on 27 October 1889.
George	1869	1957		Grandson of Christian IX and Louise of Hesse-Kassel	Also a prince of Greece by birth. Married Princess Marie Bonaparte on 21 November 1907.
Nicholas	1872	1938		Grandson of Christian IX and Louise of Hesse-Kassel	Also a prince of Greece by birth. Married Elena Vladimirovna of Russia on 29 August 1902.
Andrew	1882	1944		Grandson of Christian IX and Louise of Hesse-Kassel	Also a prince of Greece by birth. Married Alice of Battenberg on 6 October 1903.
Christopher	1888	1940		Grandson of Christian IX and Louise of Hesse-Kassel	Also a prince of Greece by birth. First Marriage Nancy Leeds on 1 February 1920, widowed in 1923. Second Marriage Françoise of Orléans on 11 February 1929.
Aage Christian Alexander Robert	1887	1940		Grandson of Christian IX and Louise of Hesse-Kassel	Lost title upon unequal Marriage to Matilda Calvi dei conti di Bergolo on 1 February 1914. Assumed the title "Count of Rosenborg".
Axel Christian Georg	1888	1964		Grandson of Christian IX and Louise of Hesse-Kassel	Married Margaretha of Sweden on 22 May 1919.
Erik Frederik Christian Alexander	1890	1950		Grandson of Christian IX and Louise of Hesse-Kassel	Lost title upon unequal Marriage to Lois Frances Booth on 11 February 1924. Assumed the title "Count of Rosenborg".
Viggo Christian Adolf Georg	1893	1970		Grandson of Christian IX and Louise of Hesse-Kassel	Lost title upon unequal Marriage to Eleanor Margaret Green on 10 June 1924. Assumed the title "Count of Rosenborg".
Christian Frederik Franz Michael Carl Valdemar Georg later, Frederik IX	1899	1972		Son of Christian X and Alexandrine of Mecklenburg-Schwerin	Reigned 1947–1972. Married Ingrid of Sweden on 24 May 1935.
Knud Christian Frederik Michael	1900	1976		Son of Christian X and Alexandrine of Mecklenburg-Schwerin	Married Caroline-Mathilde of Denmark on 8 September 1933.
Alexander Edward Christian Frederik later, Olav V, King of Norway	1903	1991		Grandson of Frederik VIII and Louise of Sweden	Became Crown Prince of Norway in 1905. Reigned as King of Norway from 1957 until his death. Married Märtha of Sweden on 21 March 1929, widowed in 1954.
Gorm Christian Frederik Hans Harald	1919	1991		Grandson of Frederik VIII and Louise of Sweden	Died unmarried.
Oluf Christian Carl Axel	1923	1990		Grandson of Frederik VIII and Louise of Sweden	Lost title upon unequal Marriage to Annie Helene Dorrit Puggard-Müller on 4 February 1948, divorced in 1977. Married a second time Lis Wolf-Jürgensen in 1982, divorced in 1983. Assumed the title "Count of Rosenborg".
George later, George II, King of the Hellenes	1890	1947		Great-Grandson of Christian IX and Louise of Hesse-Kassel	Also a prince of Greece by birth. King of the Hellenes from 1922 to 1924, and again 1935 until his death. Married Elisabeth of Romania on 27 February 1921, divorced in 1935.
Alexander later, Alexander I, King of the Hellenes	1893	1920		Great-Grandson of Christian IX and Louise of Hesse-Kassel	Also a prince of Greece by birth. King of the Hellenes from 1917 until his death. Married Aspasia Manos on 17 November 1919.
Paul later, Paul I, King of the Hellenes	1901	1964		Great-Grandson of Christian IX and Louise of Hesse-Kassel	Also a prince of Greece by birth. King of the Hellenes from 1947 until his death. Married Frederica of Hanover on 9 January 1938.
Peter	1908	1980		Great-Grandson of Christian IX and Louise of Hesse-Kassel	Also a prince of Greece by birth, although he only claimed the title in pretense from 1973 until his death due to the abolition of the Greek monarchy. Married Irina Aleksandrovna Ovtchinnikova on 5 June 1941.
Philip later, Prince Philip, Duke of Edinburgh	1921	2021		Great-Grandson of Christian IX and Louise of Hesse-Kassel	Also a prince of Greece by birth. He renounced his Greek princely title and style before his marriage. Created Duke of Edinburgh by his father-in-law, George VI, King of the United Kingdom in 1947. Created a prince of the United Kingdom in 1957. Married Elizabeth II, Queen of the United Kingdom, 20 November 1947.
Michael	1939	2024		Great-Grandson of Christian IX and Louise of Hesse-Kassel	Also a prince of Greece by birth. Since the abolition of the Greek monarchy in 1973, he now only claims the Greek princely title in pretense. Married Marina Karella on 7 February 1965.
Georg Valdemar Carl Axel	1920	1986		Great-Grandson of Christian IX and Louise of Hesse-Kassel	Married Anne, Viscountess Anson on 16 September 1950, widowed in 1980.
Flemming Valdemar Carl Axel	1922	2002		Great-Grandson of Christian IX and Louise of Hesse-Kassel	Lost title upon unequal Marriage to Alice Ruth Nielsen on 24 May 1949. Assumed the title "Count of Rosenborg"
Henrik Marie Jean André	1934	2018		Husband of Margrethe II	Made a prince of Denmark upon his Marriage to Princess Margrethe on 10 June 1967.
Ingolf Christian Frederik Knud Harald Gorm Gustav Viggo Valdemar Aage	1940			Grandson of Christian X and Alexandrine of Mecklenburg-Schwerin	Lost title upon unequal Marriage to Inge Terney on 13 January 1968, widowed in 1996. Second Marriage Sussie Hjorhøy on 7 March 1998. Assumed the title "Count of Rosenborg."
Christian Frederik Franz Knud Harald Carl Oluf Gustav Georg Erik	1942	2013		Grandson of Christian X and Alexandrine of Mecklenburg-Schwerin	Lost title upon unequal Marriage to Anne Dorte Maltoft-Nielsen on 27 February 1971. Assumed the title "Count of Rosenborg."
Constantine later, Constantine II, King of the Hellenes	1940	2023		Great-great-grandson of Christian IX and Louise of Hesse-Kassel	Also a prince of Greece by birth. King of the Hellenes from 1964 to 1973. Married Anne-Marie of Denmark on 18 September 1964. Since the abolition of the Greek monarchy, any Greek royal titles he claims are in pretense.
Frederik André Henrik Christian later, Frederik X	1968			Son of Margrethe II and Henri de Laborde de Monpezat	Reigned 2024–present. Also created Count of Monpezat on 30 April 2008. Married Mary Donaldson on 14 May 2004.
Joachim Holger Waldemar Christian	1969			Son of Margrethe II and Henri de Laborde de Monpezat	Also created Count of Monpezat on 30 April 2008. First Marriage Alexandra Manley on 18 November 1995, divorced in 2005. Second Marriage Marie Cavallier on 24 May 2008.
Pavlos	1967			Great-great-great grandson of Christian IX and Louise of Hesse-Kassel & matriline grandson of Frederik IX and Ingrid of Sweden	Also a prince of Greece by birth. Since the abolition of the Greek monarchy in 1973, any Greek royal titles he claims are now solely in pretense. Married Marie-Chantal Miller on 1 July 1995.
Nikolaos	1969			Great-great-great grandson of Christian IX and Louise of Hesse-Kassel & matriline grandson of Frederik IX and Ingrid of Sweden	Also a prince of Greece by birth. Since the abolition of the Greek monarchy in 1973, he now only claims the Greek princely title in pretense. Married Tatiana Blatnik on 25 August 2010, divorced in 2024. He then married Chrysí Vardinogianni on 7 February 2025.
Philippos	1986			Great-great-great grandson of Christian IX and Louise of Hesse-Kassel & matriline grandson of Frederik IX and Ingrid of Sweden	Also a prince of Greece by birth. As Greece abolished the monarchy in 1973, he only claims the title in pretense.
Christian Valdemar Henri John	2005			Grandson of Margrethe II and Henri de Laborde de Monpezat	Also created Count of Monpezat on 30 April 2008.
Vincent Frederik Minik Alexander	2011			Grandson of Margrethe II and Henri de Laborde de Monpezat	Also Count of Monpezat by birth.
Nikolai William Alexander Frederik	1999			Grandson of Margrethe II and Henri de Laborde de Monpezat	Lost his title of prince 1 January 2023. Also created Count of Monpezat on 30 April 2008.
Felix Henrik Valdemar Christian	2002			Grandson of Margrethe II and Henri de Laborde de Monpezat	Lost his title of prince 1 January 2023. Also created Count of Monpezat on 30 April 2008.
Henrik Carl Joachim Alain	2009			Grandson of Margrethe II and Henri de Laborde de Monpezat	Lost his title of prince 1 January 2023. Also Count of Monpezat by birth.
Constantine-Alexios	1998			Great-great-great-great grandson of Christian IX and Louise of Hesse-Kassel & matriline great-grandson of Frederik IX and Ingrid of Sweden	Also a prince of Greece by birth. As Greece abolished the monarchy in 1973, he only claims the title in pretense.
Achileas-Andreas	2000			Great-great-great-great grandson of Christian IX and Louise of Hesse-Kassel & matriline great-grandson of Frederik IX and Ingrid of Sweden	Also a prince of Greece by birth. As Greece abolished the monarchy in 1973, he only claims the title in pretense.
Odysseas-Kimon	2004			Great-great-great-great grandson of Christian IX and Louise of Hesse-Kassel & matriline great-grandson of Frederik IX and Ingrid of Sweden	Also a prince of Greece by birth. As Greece abolished the monarchy in 1973, he only claims the title in pretense.
Aristides-Stavros	2008			Great-great-great-great grandson of Christian IX and Louise of Hesse-Kassel & matriline great-grandson of Frederik IX and Ingrid of Sweden	Also a prince of Greece by birth. As Greece abolished the monarchy in 1973, he only claims the title in pretense.
