= Count of Rosenborg =

Danish noble title

- The coat of arms of the counts of Rosenborg.
- Creation date: 5 February 1914 (first creation); 27 February 1971 (last creation)
- Created by: Christian IX; Christian X; Frederik IX
- First holder: Prince Aage, Count of Rosenborg
- Status: Extant

Count of Rosenborg (Danish: Greve af Rosenborg) is a Danish hereditary title of nobility granted by the monarchs of Denmark to some men formerly titled as princes of Denmark and their descendants.

Traditionally, the title has been conferred to male princes who married morganatically, and thus could not obtain a consent for marriage by the sovereign, which consequently resulted in the forfeiture of their dynastic rights, including succession to the Danish throne, royal styles and princely titulature. The comital title refers to Rosenborg Castle in Copenhagen.

During the 20th century several lines with the title and name Count of Rosenborg were separated from the Danish royal family. There are seven lines of the Counts of Rosenborg, the first of which became extinct on the male side in 1995. The title was first given to Prince Valdemar's son Prince Aage in 1914, after he morganatically eloped with Matilda Calvi, daughter of Count Carlo Giorgio di Bergolo. Most recently, Hereditary Prince Knud's two sons, Prince Ingolf and Prince Christian, received the title in 1967 and 1971, respectively.

Being former agnatic members of the royal house of Denmark, original holders of the title Count of Rosenborg were assigned the highest place in the Danish order of precedence (1st Class, No. 1), in recognition of their preeminence. They remain the highest-ranking nobles in the Danish nobility, though their male-line descendants rank below the Counts of Danneskiold-Samsøe, who also descend from Danish Kings. Currently, Count Ingolf is the only remaining Count of Rosenborg in the first class.

== History ==
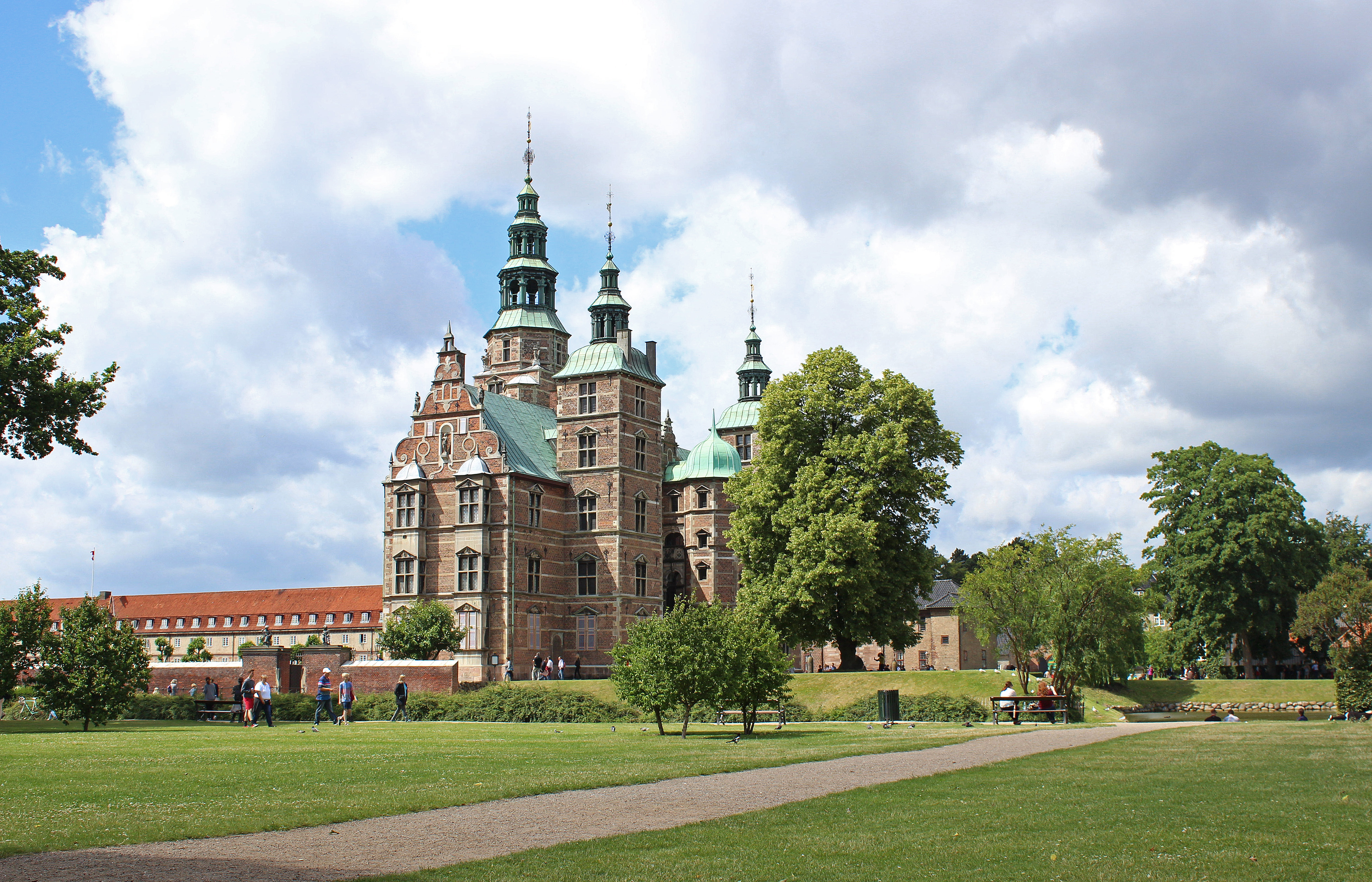
Rosenborg Castle, the eponymous renaissance castle in the centre of Copenhagen, Denmark.

The history of the Count of Rosenborg title is closely tied to the Danish royal family's regulations on dynastic marriages and succession rights. In the event that a member of the Danish royal family enters into a marriage without the explicit permission of the sovereign, that person renounces his or her own right of succession and that of his or her descendants. The Danish monarch's right to exercise this authority is established in the Danish Constitution and the Act of Succession (Danish: Tronfølgeloven). Furthermore, this authority is specifically enshrined in the King's Law (Lex Regia), the 1665 absolutist constitution of Denmark-Norway, which was repealed with the promulgation of the Danish Constitution in 1848, except for two articles, which are still applicable, Article 21 of which reads "‘No Prince of the Blood (...) shall marry (...) unless he receives Permission from the King".

When Prince Aage, son of Prince Valdemar (youngest child of King Christian IX), married Mathilde Calvi in 1914, he did not obtain the necessary permission from the King. He thereby renounced his dynastic right to the Danish throne, the title Prince of Denmark and the qualification Royal Highness. On 5 February 1914, Christian IX granted him the title Count of Rosenborg. The comital title in the Danish nobility was made hereditary for all of his legitimate descendants in the male line with the rank and precedence (above other counts) of a lensgreve. Subsequently, it became custom in the 20th century to grant this title to male princes, who made unequal marriages.

Since its first creation in 1914, the title Count of Rosenborg has been created an additional six times. Prince Erik and Prince Viggo of Denmark, the youngest sons of Prince Valdemar (brother of Frederick VIII), were both created counts of Rosenborg upon their morganatic marriages in 1923 and 1924, respectively. All of the three sons of Prince Valdemar, who assumed the Rosenborg title were additionally granted the style Highness and were allowed to use the non-royal prefix "Prince", for themselves and their wives exclusively. The second son of Prince Valdemar, Prince Axel of Denmark married his cousin of the royal house of Sweden, Princess Margaretha, and thus retained his place as a hereditary successor. However, his son Prince Flemming, married morganatically in 1949, and thus renounced for himself and his descendants the title of Prince of Denmark and the qualification of Highness, and received the title Count of Rosenborg. Frederick VIII's youngest son, Prince Harald (1876–1949), was the father of Prince Oluf (1923–1990), who became Count of Rosenborg in 1948. Most recently, Hereditary Prince Knud's two sons, Prince Ingolf and Prince Christian, received the title in 1967 and 1971, respectively.

The wife of a Count of Rosenborg is entitled to use the title Countess of Rosenborg, such as Countess Anne Dorte. Male children of counts will pass on the comital title to their male descendants, whereas female children are only entitled to use the title ‘comtesse’ until they are married, after which they relinquish this title. The original Counts of Rosenborg were placed in the 1st Class No. 1 of the Danish order of precedence, and they were are thus entitled to the style "His Excellency", whereas their male descendants and comtesses of Rosenborg are placed in the 2nd class, No. 2. Count Ingolf of Rosenborg is the only remaining directly created count of Rosenborg, and thus retains the style "His Excellency".

=== Recent history ===
Since the reign of Queen Margrethe II, the custom of bestowing the title has been discontinued, and the Queen has allowed her two sons, Frederik and Joachim, to marry non-princely.

== Creations and Rosenborg descendants ==
In total, seven lines were separated from the Danish royal family, four of which are currently extant. The marriages of Counts Viggo and Ingolf of Rosenborg remained childless. The line of Prince Aage became extinct in 1995 with his only childless son. Count Christian had only female progeny, who all married between 1995 and 2004 and thus lost their titles. The three remaining lines of Counts Erik, Flemming and Oluf continue to flourish.

=== Original creations ===
Line extinct in the male line

Grandee	Reason for loss of dynastic rights	Date
Prince Aage	renounced in 1914 due to his marriage to Mathilde Calvi.	1 February 1914
Prince Erik	renounced in 1924 due to his marriage to Lois Frances Booth.	11 February 1924
Prince Viggo	renounced in 1924 due to his marriage to Eleanor Margaret Green.	10 June 1924
Prince Oluf	renounced in 1948 due to his marriage to Annie Helene Dorrit Puggard-Müller.	4 February 1948
Prince Flemming	renounced in 1949 due to his marriage to Ruth Nielsen.	24 May 1949
Prince Ingolf	renounced in 1968 due to his unauthorised marriage to Inge Terney.	13 January 1968
Prince Christian	renounced in 1971 due to his unauthorised marriage to Anne Dorte Maltoft-Nielsen.	27 February 1971

=== Counts of Rosenborg and their descendants ===
- Christian IX of Denmark (1818–1906)
  - Frederick VIII of Denmark (1843–1912)
    - Christian X of Denmark (1870–1947)
      - Knud, Hereditary Prince of Denmark (1900–1976)
        - Count Ingolf of Rosenborg
        - Count Christian of Rosenborg (1942–2013)
          - Countess Josephine of Rosenborg
          - Countess Camilla of Rosenborg
          - Countess Feodora of Rosenborg
    - Prince Harald of Denmark (1876–1949)
      - Count Oluf of Rosenborg (1923–1990)
        - Count Ulrik of Rosenborg
          - Count Philip of Rosenborg
          - Countess Katharina of Rosenborg
        - Countess Charlotte of Rosenborg
  - Prince Valdemar of Denmark (1858–1939)
    - Prince Aage, Count of Rosenborg (1887–1940)
      - Count Valdemar of Rosenborg (1915–1995)
    - Prince Axel of Denmark (1888–1964)
      - Count Flemming of Rosenborg (1922–2002)
        - Count Axel of Rosenborg
          - Countess Julie of Rosenborg
          - Count Carl Johan of Rosenborg
            - Countess Dagmar of Rosenborg
            - Count Valdemar of Rosenborg
          - Countess Désirée of Rosenborg
          - Count Alexander of Rosenborg
        - Count Birger of Rosenborg
          - Countess Benedikte of Rosenborg
        - Count Carl Johan of Rosenborg
          - Countess Caroline of Rosenborg
          - Countess Josefine of Rosenborg
        - Countess Désirée of Rosenborg
    - Prince Erik, Count of Rosenborg (1890–1950)
      - Count Christian of Rosenborg (1932–1997)
        - Count Valdemar of Rosenborg
          - Count Nikolai of Rosenborg
          - Countess Marie of Rosenborg
        - Countess Marina of Rosenborg
    - Prince Viggo, Count of Rosenborg (1893–1970)

== See also ==
- Rosenborg Castle
- Count of Monpezat
- Count of Wisborg
- Danneskiold-Samsøe family
- Danish royal family
