= Christian of Denmark =

Christian of Denmark may refer to:

== Kings ==
- Christian I (1426–1481; r. 1448–1481), King of Denmark
- Christian II (1481–1559; r. 1513–1523), King of Denmark
- Christian III (1503–1559; r. 1534–1559), King of Denmark
- Christian IV (1577–1648; r. 1588–1648), King of Denmark
- Christian V (1646–1699; r. 1670–1699), King of Denmark
- Christian VI (1699–1746; r. 1730–1746), King of Denmark
- Christian VII (1749–1808; r. 1766–1808), King of Denmark
- Christian VIII (1786–1848; r. 1839–1848), King of Denmark
- Christian IX (1818–1906; r. 1863–1906), King of Denmark
- Christian X (1870–1947; r. 1912–1947), King of Denmark

== Other people ==
- Christian, Prince-Elect of Denmark (1603–1647), eldest surviving son of Christian IV
- Prince Christian of Denmark (1675–1695), third son of Christian V
- Count Christian of Rosenborg (1942–2013), grandson of Christian X and Danish prince by birth
- Christian, Crown Prince of Denmark (born 2005), eldest son of Frederik X

== See also ==
- Christian, Crown Prince of Denmark (disambiguation)
- Prince Christian (disambiguation)
