= Danish royal family =

Family of the Danish monarch

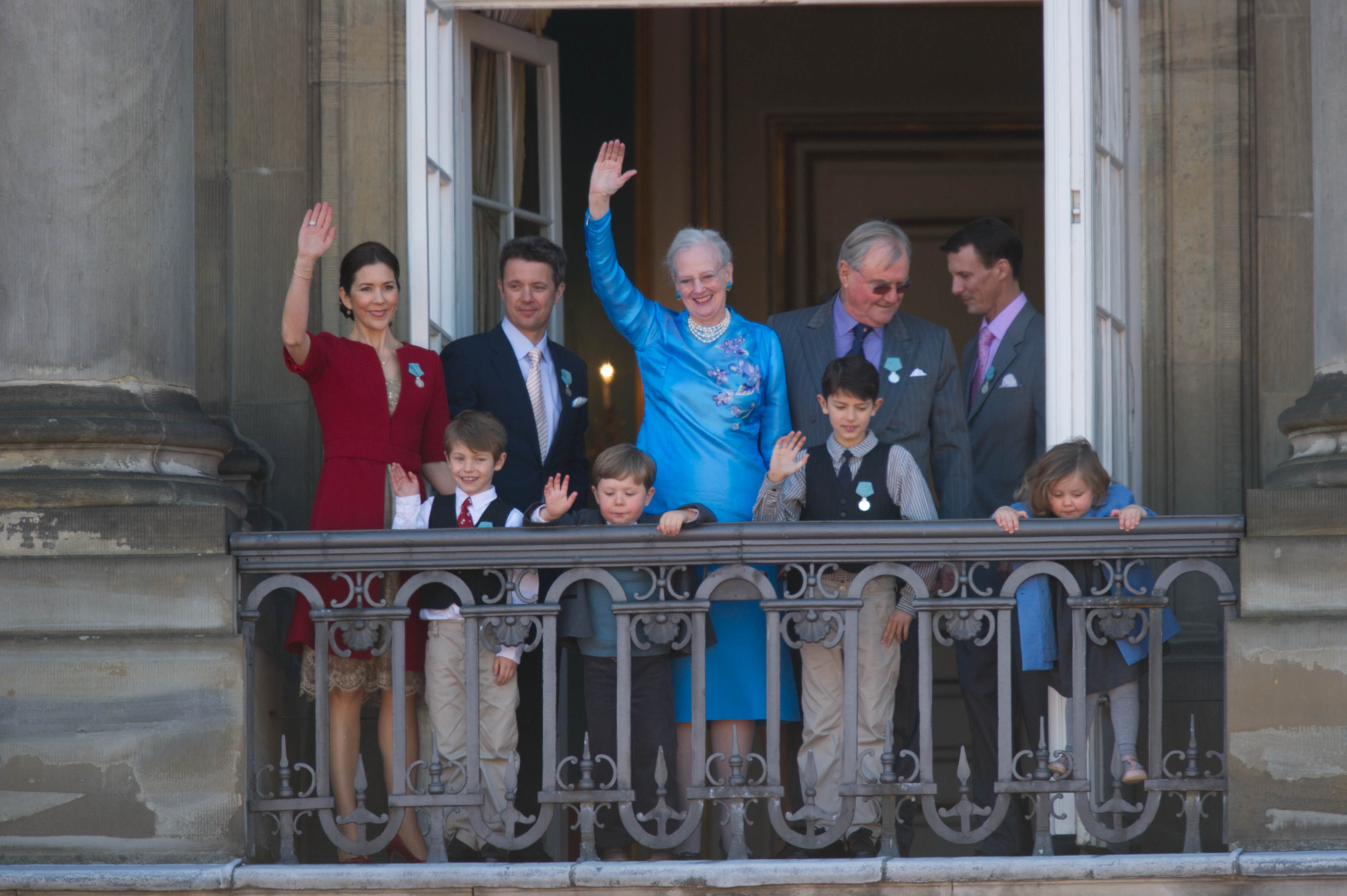
The royal family of Denmark during the Queen Margrethe II's 70th birthday on 16 April 2010. From left to right: Queen Mary of Denmark (then Crown Princess), Count Felix (then Prince Felix), King Frederik X (then Crown Prince), Crown Prince Christian (then Prince Christian), Queen Margrethe II, Count Nikolai (then Prince Nikolai), Prince Henrik, Prince Joachim and Princess Isabella

The Danish royal family is the dynastic family of the monarch of Denmark. While some members of the Danish royal family hold the title of Prince(ss) of Denmark, descendants of Margrethe II of Denmark additionally bear the title Count(ess) of Monpezat. Children of the monarch are accorded the style of His/Her Royal Highness. The King and Queen are styled Majesty.

Through his mother, Margrethe II, King Frederik X and his descendants belong to the House of Glücksburg, which is a branch of the royal House of Oldenburg. Margrethe II's children and male-line descendants also belong agnatically to the Laborde de Monpezat family, and were given the concurrent title Count/Countess of Monpezat by royal decree on 30 April 2008.

The Danish royal family receives remarkably high approval ratings in Denmark, ranging between 82% and 92%.

== Main members ==
The Danish royal family includes:

- King Frederik X and Queen Mary (the King and his wife)
  - Crown Prince Christian (the King's son)
  - Princess Isabella (the King's daughter)
  - Prince Vincent (the King's son)
  - Princess Josephine (the King's daughter)
- Queen Margrethe II (the King's mother)
  - Prince Joachim and Princess Marie (the King's brother and sister-in-law)
    - Count Nikolai (the King's nephew)
    - Count Felix (the King's nephew)
    - Count Henrik (the King's nephew)
    - Countess Athena (the King's niece)
- Princess Benedikte (the King's aunt)
- Queen Anne-Marie of the Hellenes (the King's aunt)

=== Family tree of members ===
King Frederik IX	Queen Ingrid
Prince Henrik	Queen Margrethe II	The Dowager Princess of Sayn-Wittgenstein-Berleburg	King Constantine II of the Hellenes	Queen Anne-Marie of the Hellenes
Greek royal family*
The King	The Queen	Alexandra, Countess of Frederiksborg (div. 2005)	Prince Joachim	Princess Marie
Crown Prince Christian	Princess Isabella	Prince Vincent	Princess Josephine	Count Nikolai	Count Felix	Count Henrik	Countess Athena

Note

* Extended members include the Greek royal family

== Members of the extended royal family ==
=== Royal family of Greece ===
Most of the members of the deposed royal family of Greece hold the title of Prince or Princess of Greece and Denmark with the qualification of His or Her Highness, pursuant to the Royal Cabinet Order of 1774 and as agnatic descendants of George I of Greece, who, as the son of the future King Christian IX of Denmark, was (and remained) a "Prince of Denmark" prior to his accession to the throne of Greece in 1863. Until 1953, his dynastic male-line descendants remained in Denmark's order succession. However, no Danish act has revoked usage of the princely title for these descendants, neither for those living in 1953, nor for those born subsequently or who have since married into the dynasty.

There are three members of the Greek royal family who are not known to bear the title of Prince/ss of Denmark with the qualification of His/Her Highness.

- Marina, Princess Michael of Greece and Denmark
- Princess Alexandra of Greece
- The Duchess of Aosta

The following, consorts of royal monarchs today, were born with the titles of Prince/Princess of Greece and Denmark, although they are not descended from King Constantine and Queen Anne-Marie:

- Queen Sofía of Spain (King Constantine's sister and Queen Anne-Marie's sister-in-law)

=== Norwegian royal family ===
The Norwegian royal family descends in the legitimate male line from Frederick VIII of Denmark, Queen Margrethe II's great-grandfather. Haakon VII of Norway, who was born Prince Carl of Denmark as Frederik VIII's younger son, was, like his uncle, George I of Greece, invited to reign over another nation. As with the Greek branch's descendants, members of the Norwegian line no longer have succession rights to the Danish crown, but unlike the Greek dynasties, they discontinued use of Danish royal titles upon ascending to the Norwegian throne in 1905.

=== Counts and countesses of Monpezat ===
On 30 April 2008, the Queen of Denmark granted to her two sons, Crown Prince Frederik and Prince Joachim, and their legitimate patrilineal descendants of both sexes the hereditary title "Count of Monpezat". The title is based on the French title "Comte de Laborde de Monpezat" which was used by their father Henrik, Prince Consort of Denmark.

On 29 September 2022, it was announced that from 1 January 2023, the titles of Prince and Princess of Denmark, and style of Highness of the 4 children of Queen Margrethe II's younger son, Prince Joachim, would be discontinued. They will instead be titled "His/Her Excellency Count/Countess Nikolai/Felix/Henrik/Athena of Monpezat". All four grandchildren maintain their places in the order of succession to the throne.

=== Counts and countesses of Rosenborg ===
Danish princes who marry without the consent of the Danish monarch lose their succession rights, as do their descendants. They are then usually accorded the hereditary title "Count of Rosenborg". They are entitled to the style "His/Her Excellency". They and their legitimate male-line descendants are:

- Christian IX of Denmark (1818–1906)
  - Frederick VIII of Denmark (1843–1912)
    - Christian X of Denmark (1870–1947)
      - Knud, Hereditary Prince of Denmark (1900–1976)
        - Count Ingolf of Rosenborg
        - Count Christian of Rosenborg (1942–2013)
          - Countess Josephine of Rosenborg
          - Countess Camilla of Rosenborg
          - Countess Feodora of Rosenborg
    - Prince Harald of Denmark (1876–1949)
      - Count Oluf of Rosenborg (1923–1990)
        - Count Ulrik of Rosenborg
          - Count Philip of Rosenborg
          - Countess Katharina of Rosenborg
        - Countess Charlotte of Rosenborg
  - Prince Valdemar of Denmark (1858–1939)
    - Prince Axel of Denmark (1888–1964)
      - Count Flemming of Rosenborg (1922–2002)
        - Count Axel of Rosenborg
          - Countess Julie of Rosenborg
          - Count Carl Johan of Rosenborg
            - Countess Dagmar of Rosenborg
            - Count Valdemar of Rosenborg
          - Countess Désirée of Rosenborg
          - Count Alexander of Rosenborg
      - Count Birger of Rosenborg
        - Countess Benedikte of Rosenborg
      - Count Carl Johan of Rosenborg
        - Countess Caroline of Rosenborg
        - Countess Josefine of Rosenborg
      - Countess Désirée of Rosenborg
    - Prince Erik, Count of Rosenborg (1890–1950)
      - Count Christian of Rosenborg (1932–1997)
        - Count Valdemar of Rosenborg
          - Count Nikolai of Rosenborg
          - Countess Marie of Rosenborg
        - Countess Marina of Rosenborg

=== Counts and countesses of Samsøe ===
The Danneskiold-Samsøe family are the descendants of the eldest son of Christian V and his mistress Sofie Amalie Moth, whom the king elevated to be the first Lensgrevinde til Samsø ("Countess of Samsø"). A descendant, Countess Frederikke Louise af Danneskiold-Samsøe (1699-1744) married her kinsman Christian August, Duke of Schleswig-Holstein-Sonderburg-Augustenburg. By royal statutory regulation, the Counts of Danneskiold-Samsøe and their male-line descendants are ranked as the second-highest nobles in Denmark, second only to the Counts of Rosenborg, whom also descend from the Danish Kings. With a place in the 1st Class No. 13, they are entitled to the style "His/Her Excellency".

== Line of succession ==
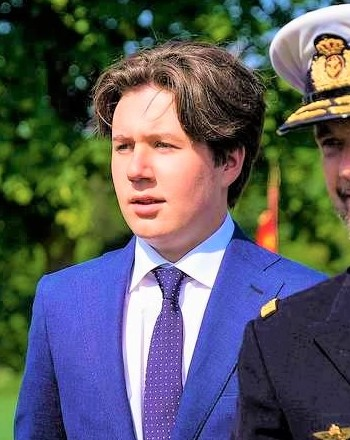
Then-prince (now crown prince) Christian in 2021.

The first law governing the succession to the Danish throne as a hereditary monarchy was Kongeloven (Lex Regia), enacted on 14 November 1665, and published in 1709. It declared that the crown of Denmark descends by heredity to the legitimate descendants of King Frederick III, and that the order of succession follows semi-Salic primogeniture, according to which the crown is inherited by an heir, with preference among the monarch's children to men over women; among siblings to the elder over the younger; and among Frederick III's remoter descendants by substitution, senior branches over junior branches. Female descendants were eligible to inherit the throne in the event there were no eligible surviving male dynasts born in the male line.

As for the duchies, Holstein and Lauenburg where the King ruled as duke, these lands adhered to Salic law (meaning that only men could inherit the ducal throne), and by mutual agreement, were permanently conjoined. The duchies of Schleswig (a Danish fief), Holstein and Lauenburg (German fiefs) were joined in personal union with the Kingdom of Denmark.

This difference caused problems when Frederick VII of Denmark didn't produce any children, making a change in dynasty imminent, and causing the lines of succession for the duchies on one hand and for Denmark on the other to diverge. To ensure that future Kings of Denmark would continue also being Dukes of Schleswig, Holstein, and Lauenburg, the line of succession to the duchies was modified in the London Protocol of 1852, which designated Prince Christian of Schleswig-Holstein-Sonderburg-Glücksburg, as the new heir apparent, although he was, strictly, the heir neither to the Kingdom of Denmark nor to the Duchies of Schleswig, Holstein, or Lauenburg by primogeniture. Originally, the Danish prime minister Christian Albrecht Bluhme wanted to keep the separate hereditary principles, but in the end, the government decided on a uniform agnatic primogeniture, which was accepted by the Parliament. Even after the loss of the duchies in the Second Schleswig War of 1864, the style of the Danish monarchs included references to the duchies until the style was shortened in 1972 on the accession of Margrethe II.

Problems emerged again when Frederik IX became king in 1947. He had only daughters, and it seemed unlikely that he would have a son, leaving his brother Knud as heir presumptive. As part of the 1953 constitutional referendum, a new Act of Succession introduced male-preference primogeniture, allowing women with no brothers to inherit. In 2009, the succession law was amended after the Act of Succession referendum, this time to introduce absolute primogeniture. This had no immediate effect on the line of succession, and the first person affected by the 2009 amendment was Prince Vincent, who on his birth in 2011 would have otherwise been ahead of his older sister Princess Isabella in the succession. As of 2024 the line of succession is:

- King Frederik IX (1899–1972)
  - Queen Margrethe II (born 1940)
    - King Frederik X (born 1968)
      - (1) Crown Prince Christian (born 2005)
      - (2) Princess Isabella (born 2007)
      - (3) Prince Vincent (born 2011)
      - (4) Princess Josephine (born 2011)
    - (5) Prince Joachim (born 1969)
      - (6) Count Nikolai of Monpezat (born 1999)
      - (7) Count Felix of Monpezat (born 2002)
      - (8) Count Henrik of Monpezat (born 2009)
      - (9) Countess Athena of Monpezat (born 2012)
  - (10) Princess Benedikte, Princess of Sayn-Wittgenstein-Berleburg (born 1944)

== Privileges and restrictions ==
Following the transformation of Denmark's monarchy from elective (at least theoretically, although it had generally descended to the eldest son of the House of Oldenburg since 1448) to hereditary in 1660, the so-called Kongelov (Latin: Lex Regia) of 1665 established the reign "by the grace of God" of King Frederick III and his posterity. Of the articles of this law, all except Article 21 and Article 25 have been repealed by amendments to the Constitution in 1849, 1853, 1953, and 2009.

Article 21 states "No Prince of the Blood, who resides here in the Realm and in Our territory, shall marry, or leave the Country, or take service under foreign Masters, unless he receives Permission from the King". Under this provision, princes of Denmark who permanently reside in other realms by express permission of the Danish Crown (i.e. members of the dynasties of Greece, Norway and the United Kingdom) do not thereby forfeit their royalty in Denmark, nor are they bound to obtain prior permission to travel abroad or to marry from its sovereign, although since 1953 those not descended in male-line from King Christian X are no longer in the line of succession to the Danish throne. However, those who do reside in Denmark or its territories require the monarch's prior permission to travel abroad and to marry.

Article 25 stipulates, with respect to blood members of the Royal dynasty: "They should answer to no Magistrate Judges, but their first and last Judge shall be the King, or to whomsoever He decrees." The wording excludes those whose blood cannot be traced to a Danish monarch (e.g., the present Queen).

== Notes ==
^{1}Princess Benedikte's children have no succession rights. This is because the marriage consent given to her had very specific provisions; if Benedikte ever became the heir presumptive, she and her husband would have to take permanent residence in Denmark and her children would have succession rights only if they had applied for naturalization upon reaching adulthood, and taken up residence in Denmark: (a) at the time of becoming the immediate heir to the throne, and (b) no later than when they reached the age of mandatory schooling under Danish law. Since the children continued to be educated in Germany well past the mandatory schooling age, they are deemed to no longer have succession rights.

^{2}Queen Anne-Marie has no succession rights, and her descendants have none through her, because the permission granted for her marriage stipulated that she renounced her claim to the Danish throne upon becoming queen consort of the Hellenes.

== See also ==
- Danish nobility
- Succession to the Norwegian throne
