= Christian, Crown Prince of Denmark (disambiguation) =

Christian, Crown Prince of Denmark (born 2005), is the heir apparent to King Frederik X.

Christian, Crown Prince of Denmark, may also refer to:

- Christian V of Denmark (1646–1699; r. 1670–1699), heir to King Frederick III from 1665 to 1670
- Christian VI (1699–1746; r. 1730–1746), heir to King Frederick IV from 1699 to 1730
- Christian VII (1749–1808; r. 1766–1808), heir to King Frederick V from 1749 to 1766
- Christian X (1870–1947; r. 1912–1947), heir to King Frederick VIII from 1906 to 1912

== See also ==
- Christian, Prince-Elect of Denmark (1603–1647), designated heir to King Christian IV from 1610 to 1647
- Christian VIII (1786–1848; r. 1839–1848), hereditary prince from 1808 to 1839 as heir to King Frederick VI
- Christian IX (1818–1906; r. 1863–1906), heir to King Frederick VII in 1863
- Christian of Denmark (disambiguation)
- Prince Christian (disambiguation)
