= Christian Prince =

Christian Prince may refer to:

- Murder of Christian Prince, murder victim in New Haven, Connecticut.
- The Education of a Christian Prince, a Renaissance "how-to" book for princes, by Desiderius Erasmus

== See also ==
- Prince Christian (disambiguation)
