= Prince Aage, Count of Rosenborg =

Danish prince and officer of the French Foreign Legion (1887–1940)

Prince Aage
- Count of Rosenborg
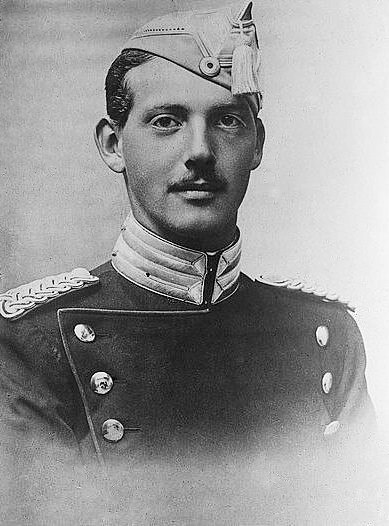
- Prince Aage photographed in 1912
- Born: 10 June 1887; Copenhagen, Denmark
- Died: 19 February 1940 (aged 52); Taza, Morocco
- Spouse: Mathilde Calvi dei conti di Bergolo (m. 1914)
- Issue: Count Valdemar
Names
- Aage Christian Alexander Robert
- House: Glücksburg
- Father: Prince Valdemar of Denmark
- Mother: Princess Marie d'Orléans
- Military career
- Allegiance: Denmark; France
- Branch: Royal Danish Army; French Foreign Legion
- Service years: 1909–1940
- Rank: Captain (DNK); Lieutenant colonel (FRA)
- Awards: Légion d'honneur

Prince Aage, Count of Rosenborg, (Aage Christian Alexander Robert; 10 June 1887 – 19 February 1940) was a Danish prince and officer of the French Foreign Legion. He was born in Copenhagen the eldest child and son of Prince Valdemar of Denmark and Princess Marie d'Orléans.

== Early life ==
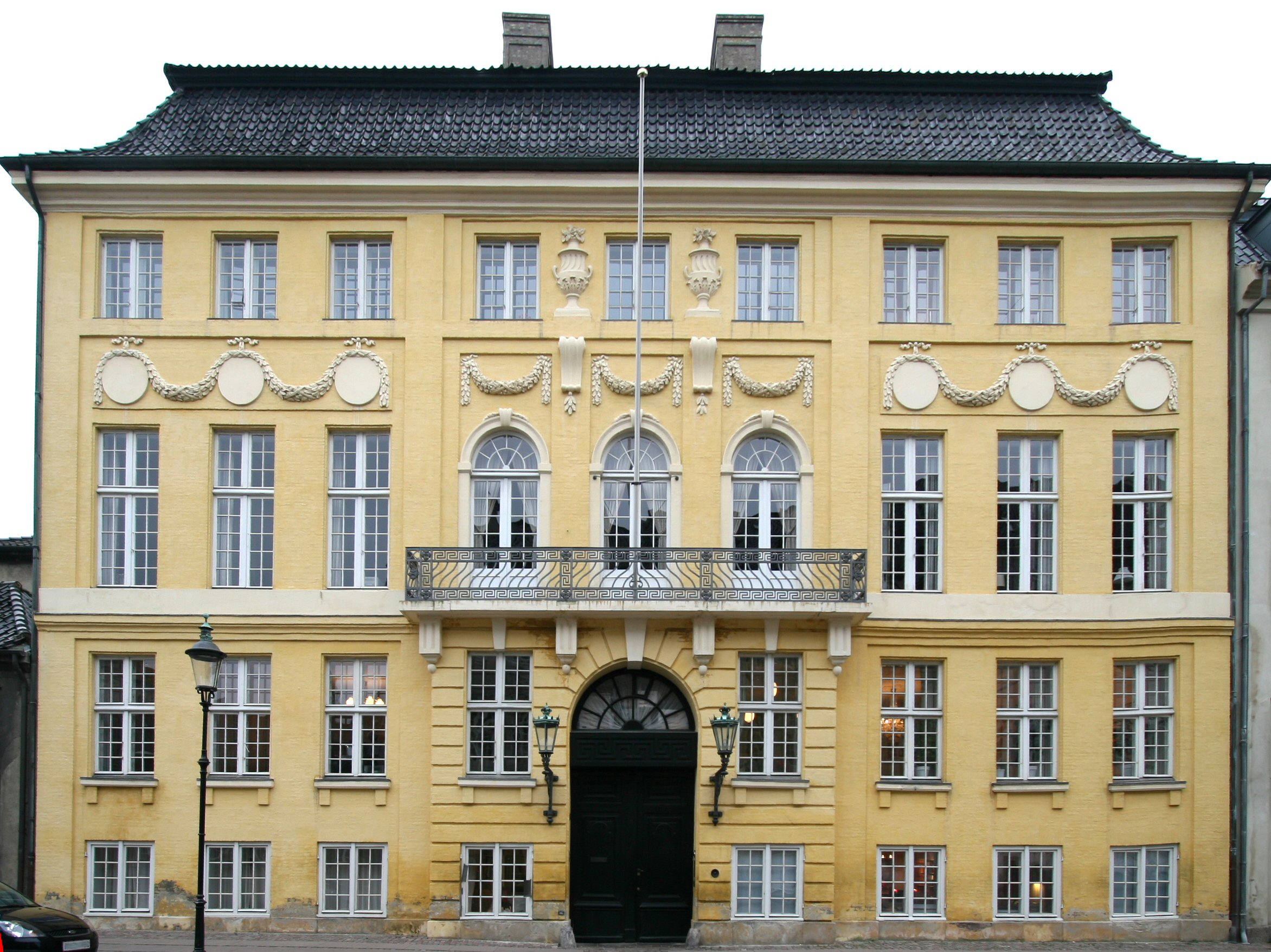
The Yellow Palace, Copenhagen: Prince Aage's childhood home

Prince Aage was born on 10 June 1887, in the Yellow Palace, an 18th-century town house at 18 Amaliegade, immediately adjacent to the Amalienborg Palace complex in Copenhagen. He was the first child of Prince Valdemar of Denmark, and his wife Princess Marie of Orléans. His father was a younger son of King Christian IX of Denmark and Louise of Hesse-Kassel, and his mother was the eldest daughter of Prince Robert, Duke of Chartres and Princess Françoise of Orléans. He was baptised with the names Aage Christian Alexander Robert, and was known as Prince Aage.

Prince Aage and his siblings grew up at the Yellow Palace in Copenhagen and at their parent's summer residence Bernstorff Palace in Gentofte north of Copenhagen.

== Romance and marriage ==
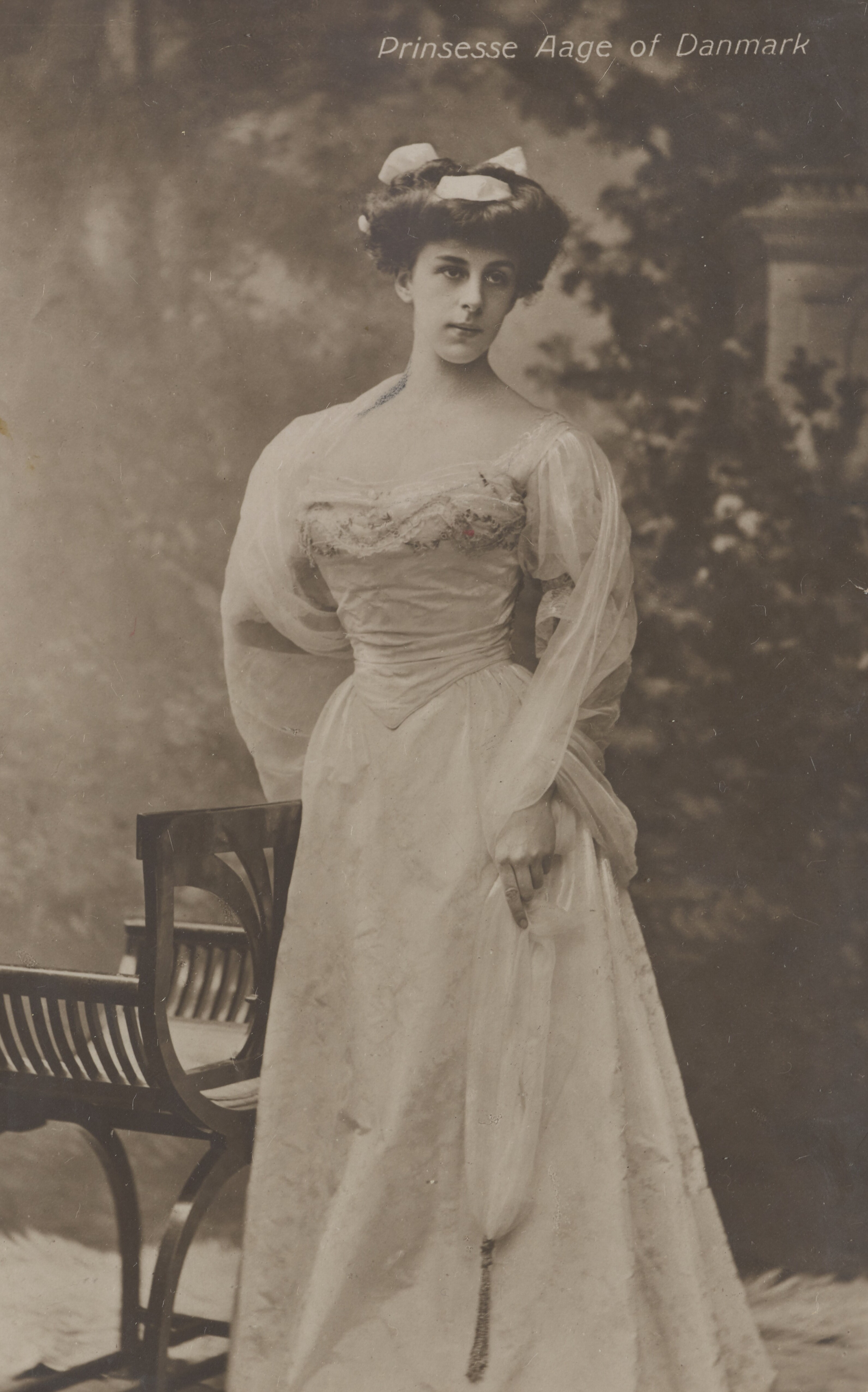
Mathilde Calvin di Bergolo in 1910s

Prince Aage carried on a passionate flirtation with Princess Marie Bonaparte, the wife of his cousin Prince George of Greece and Denmark, who had also enjoyed intimacies with his father. In neither case does it appear that Prince George objected, or felt obliged to give the matter any attention. In 1909 Prince Aage joined the Danish Army, and by 1913 had risen to the rank of lieutenant. During World War I he served as an observer in Italy for a year. Returning home to Denmark he was promoted to captain.

Without the legally required permission of the Danish king, Aage married Matilda Emilia Francesca Maria Calvi dei conti di Bergolo (Buenos Aires, 17 September 1885 – Copenhagen, 16 October 1949), daughter of Carlo Giorgio Lorenzo Calvi, 5th Count di Bergolo by his wife Baroness Anna Guidobono Calvalchini Roero San Severino, in Turin on 1 February 1914. A few days later, he renounced his place in the line of succession to the Danish throne, forfeiting the title "Prince of Denmark" and the style of Royal Highness (the latter having only been granted to him and his brothers by the king on 5 February 1904). With the king's authorisation, he assumed the title "Prince Aage, Greve af (Count of) Rosenborg" and the style of Highness on 5 February 1914. Although the comital title in the Danish nobility was made hereditary for all of his legitimate descendants in the male line with the rank and precedence (above other counts) of a Lensgreve, use of the princely prefix was restricted to himself and his wife alone. Aage and Mathilde had one son:

- Count Valdemar Alexander Georg Luigi Maria of Rosenborg (Villa Severino, Turin, 3 January 1915 – Paris, 1 April 1995), Second Lieutenant (Lifeguard) in the Royal Danish Army, Businessman in Paris, he married Baroness Marie-Josephe Floria d'Huart Saint-Mauris (Paris, 10 August 1925 - Paris, 20 August 1995) in Villefranche, Nice, on 20 April 1949, no issue.

Prince Aage was among the people considered for the position of King of Finland in 1918. In the early 1920s he mentioned to Gustaf Idman, the Finnish ambassador to Denmark, that upon visiting Copenhagen in September 1918, Finnish General Carl Gustav Emil Mannerheim had inquired about his willingness to accept the Finnish crown, should it be offered to him. According to Idman, he was willing to accept the offer.

== Foreign Legion ==
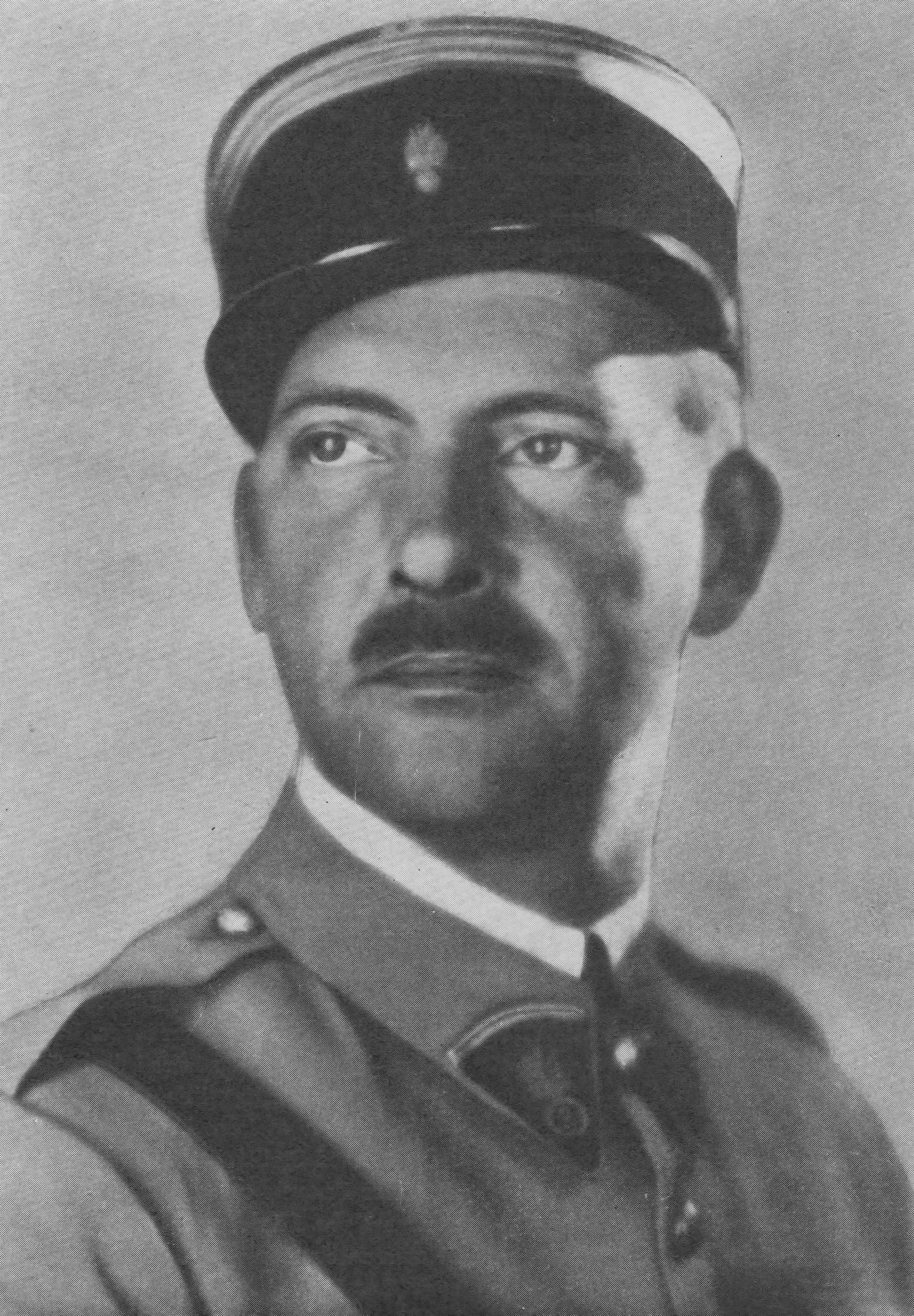
Prince Aage, Count of Rosenborg in the unifom of the Foreign Legion.

In 1922, Aage received permission from the King, as required by Danish law, to leave the Danish army in order to join the French Foreign Legion. After negotiations between the Danish and the French governments Prince Aage entered the Foreign Legion with the Officer rank of captain.

He was sent to Morocco as part of the French involvement in the Rif War within a year of service. He received the Croix de Guerre after being shot in the left leg. During his seventeen years in the Foreign Legion Prince Aage attained the rank of lieutenant colonel, and also received France's highest order, the Légion d'honneur.

In 1927 he published the book A Royal Adventurer in the Foreign Legion in English about his time in the Foreign Legion.

== Death ==
Prince Aage died of pleurisy in Taza, Morocco, in 1940, and was buried at the French Foreign Legion's headquarters at Sidi Bel Abbès, Algeria.

Before the Foreign Legion left Algeria in 1962, it was decided that the remains of three selected soldiers should be buried near the new headquarters of the Foreign Legion at Aubagne in southern France. The remains of Prince Aage were selected as the representation of the foreign officers in the Foreign Legion. His remains now lie next to those of Général Paul-Frédéric Rollet (known as the Father of the Legion) and Légionnaire Zimmermann in the town of Puyloubier, France.

== Honours ==
He received the following orders and decorations:

- Denmark:
  - R.E.: Knight of the Order of the Elephant, 10 June 1905
  - D.M.: Cross of Honour of the Order of the Dannebrog, 10 June 1905
  - Gb.E.T.: King Christian IX and Queen Louise of Denmark Golden Wedding Commemorative Medal
  - M.M. 8 Apr.: King Christian IX Centenary Medal
- Belgium: Grand Cordon of the Royal Order of Leopold
- France:
  - Chevalier of the Legion of Honour
  - Croix de Guerre
- German Empire:
  - Knight of the Order of the Black Eagle
  - Grand Cross of the Order of the Red Eagle
  - Mecklenburg: Grand Cross with Crown in Ore of the House Order of the Wendish Crown
- Kingdom of Greece: Grand Cross of the Order of the Redeemer
- Kingdom of Portugal: Grand Cross of the Order of the Tower and Sword
- Sweden: Knight of the Order of the Seraphim, 1 June 1913
- Thailand: Grand Cross of the Order of the Crown of Thailand
- United Kingdom: Honorary Grand Cross of the Royal Victorian Order
- Kingdom of Yugoslavia: Order of the Yugoslav Crown, 1st Class

== Ancestors ==
Ancestors of Prince Aage, Count of Rosenborg

8. Friedrich Wilhelm, Duke of Schleswig-Holstein-Sonderburg-Glücksburg
4. Christian IX of Denmark
9. Princess Louise Caroline of Hesse-Kassel
2. Prince Valdemar of Denmark
10. Prince William of Hesse-Kassel
5. Louise of Hesse-Kassel
11. Princess Charlotte of Denmark
1. Prince Aage, Count of Rosenberg
12. Prince Ferdinand Philippe, Duke of Orléans
6. Prince Robert, Duke of Chartres
13. Duchess Helene of Mecklenburg-Schwerin
3. Princess Marie of Orléans
14. François, Prince of Joinville
7. Princess Françoise of Orléans
15. Princess Francisca of Brazil
