= Order of precedence in Denmark =

Relative preeminence of officials for ceremonial purposes

The Danish order of precedence is a symbolic hierarchy of Danish officials used to direct protocol. It has no official status and entails no special privileges, but has been established in practical use, e.g. determining seating arrangements at formal occasions in the royal house. The order of precedence is very elaborate, and especially the lower classes include many relatively obscure civil servant positions; the following is only an excerpt.

== The royal family ==
Members of the royal family are not part of the official order of precedence, but are traditionally placed on top of the hierarchy. Their order is as follows:

- The King
- The Queen
- The Crown Prince
- Princess Isabella
- Prince Vincent
- Princess Josephine
- Queen Margrethe
- Prince Joachim
- Princess Marie
- Count Nikolai
- Count Felix
- Count Henrik
- Countess Athena
- Princess Benedikte

When the King is out of the country or otherwise unable to perform his duties, the heir apparent becomes regent. If the heir apparent is also out of the country or otherwise not able to be regent, one of four people, whom the King has chosen, (Note: And also follows the "Law on government conduct in the event of the king's immaturity, illness or absence" of 1871) can become 'rigsforstander'. (Note: While the titles 'regent' and 'rigsforstander' are different, the responsibilities of the person are the same; thus, the only difference is who functions as the acting regent.) These people are:

- Queen Margrethe
- Queen Mary of Denmark
- Prince Joachim of Denmark
- Princess Benedikte of Denmark

== The order of precedence ==
The 1st Class is the highest, and 5th Class is the lowest. Classes 1 and 2 are exhaustively listed here by the most recent officially published ranking, while classes 3–5 are summarized and only an excerpt. Within the individual classes themselves there are also secondary orders of precedence, shown here with the numbers.

=== Statutory basis ===
The Danish order of precedence is decided by royal regulation, which was first published in 1671. The current ranking is from 1746 – The Royal Regulation of 14 October 1746. Throughout time, there have been multiple revisions and changes to the order of precedence, the most recent being on 16 December 1971.

=== 1st Class ===
1. Counts of Rosenborg and the Countess of Frederiksborg
2. --
3. The Queen's Chief Court Mistress (Danish: Overhofmesterinde) (none since 1952)
4. The Prime Minister and the other Government ministers. The Queen's Maid of the Bedchamber. The Princesses' ladies-in-waiting.
5. The President of the Supreme Court
6. Knights of the Elephant
7. Grand Commanders of the Dannebrog.
8. The Lord Chamberlain of Denmark (Danish: Overkammerherre) (not in current use).
9. Generals and admirals (the Chief of Defence is the only military officer of this rank in Denmark at any given time)
10. The Chancellor of the Order. Lord Marshal of the Court (Danish: Overhofmarskal). Lieutenant generals and vice admirals
11. Lord Groom of the Chamber (Danish: Overkammerjunker).
12. Lord Master of the Horse (Danish: Overstaldmester). Lord Master of the Royal Hunt (Danish: Overjægermester). Lord Master of Ceremonies (Danish: Overceremonimester). Lord Pourer (Danish: Overskænk).
13. Counts Danneskiold-Samsøe, and their male descendants. The Mother Superior for the noble Diocese of Vallø.

=== 2nd Class ===
1. Grand Crosses of the Dannebrog
2. Counts. Ambassadors. The Court Marshal of Denmark (Danish: Hofmarskal). The male descendants of the Counts of Rosenborg. The private secretary to the Queen (Danish: Kabinetssekretær). The female descendants of the Counts (and Lensgrever) Danneskiold-Samsøe, both the unmarried and married, rank in the 2nd class No. 2. The Comtesses of Rosenborg. Extraordinary and authorized ambassadors in salary bracket 40.
3. The Queen's Chief of Staff (Danish: Hofchef)
4. The Royal Family's court marshals and chiefs of staff, according to seniority. The eldest son of a Lensgreve, when they are the chamberlains. The Queen's ladies-in-waiting. The Princesses' maids of honour. The 3 female court members (Danish: Hofstiftsdame) of the noble Diocese of Vallø.
5. Chamberlains (Danish: Kammerherre). The Captain of the Royal Yacht (Danish: Jagtkaptajn). The Chief of the Queen's aides-de-camp (Danish: Chefen for Dronningens adjudantstab). Supreme Court judges. Presidents of the High courts. The Permanent Secretaries. The Director of the Ministry of Foreign Affairs. The Director-general of the Danish Railways. The Postmaster General. Major generals and rear admirals. The Attorney General. The National Police Commissioner. The Lord Mayor of Copenhagen. The Managing Director of the National Bank of Denmark. Bishops in the Church of Denmark. The Rector of the University of Copenhagen. The Royal Danish high commissioner in Greenland. The Customs Director. The High Commissioner of the Faeroe Islands. The Surgeon general. The Judge Advocate General. The Chief Public Prosecutor. The Director General of the National Board of Health. The Prioress of Vemmetofte Convent. The 35 ladies-beneficiary of the noble Diocese of Vallø.
6. The Master of the Horse (Danish: Staldmester)
7. The Master of the Royal Hunt (Danish: Hofjægermester). The Master of Ceremonies (Danish: Ceremonimester).
8. --
9. --
10. --
11. The Royal Konfessionarius (Danish: Kongelig Konfessionarius) (equivalent to Chaplain-in-Ordinary).
12. Junior ministry secretaries. Consuls general. University rectors. The Bishop of the Faroe Islands

=== 3rd Class ===
1. Barons
2. High Court judges. Colonels and naval captains. Directors at Rigshospitalet. Regents Professor at the University of Copenhagen. Rectors of Business schools and Dental schools. Managing Directors of the National Museum of Denmark, the Danish National Archive and the Royal Danish Theatre. The Master of the Royal Mint
3. The High Court judge of Greenland
4. County Court judges. Lieutenant colonels and commanders. Chief Constables. Senior hospital physicians. Provosts in the Church of Denmark. University Professors. Gymnasium rectors

=== 4th Class ===
1. Chief inspectors. Majors and Lieutenant Commanders. Senior vicars
2. Managing directors at the regional archives. University associate professors.

=== 5th Class ===
1. Gymnasium associate professors. University assistant professors.
2. Police inspectors. Junior vicars
3. Captains and naval lieutenants.
4. Lieutenants and naval lieutenants, junior grade

== Former military order of precedence ==
	1671–1680		1680–1693		1693–1699		1699–1717		1717–1730	
	Army	Navy	Army	Navy	Army	Navy	Army	Navy	Army	Navy
First class	Ober-Feldt-Marskalk	Rigs-Admiral			General-Feldtmarskalk				General Feltmarskalk	
First class	Feldt-Marschalks	General-Admiral			Feldtmarskalk	General-Admiral			Feltmarskalk	General-Admiral
First class	General Feldt-Tøymester				General-Feldt-Tøygmester				Feltmarskalk-Lieutenant	General-Admiral-Lieutenant
First class	Feldtmarskal Lieutenant				Feldtmarskalk-Lieutenant	General-Admiral-Lieutenant			General-Feldt-Tøygmester	
First class	Generaler til Hest eller Fods				General til Hest eller Fods				General til Hest eller Fods	
First class	General-Lieutenant til Hest eller til Foeds				General-Lieutenant til Hest eller Fods				General-Lieutenant til Hest eller Fods	
Second class									General-Major	Admiral
Second class									Oberst af Garderne eller Artolleriet	
Third class	General-Major	Admiral			General-Major	Admiral			Brigadier	Vice-Admiral
Third class	Obersten over Liv-Guarden				Oberst af Garderne eller Artolleriet					
Fourth class					Brigadier					
Fourth class					Oberst over Lif-Regimenterne				Oberst over Lif-Regimenterne	Schout by Nacht
Fourth class	Oberster til Hest og til Foeds	Vice-Admiral			Oberst til Hest eller Fods	Vice-Admiral			Oberst til Hest eller Fods	
Fourth class									Oberst-Lieutenant af Garderne	
Fifth class	Oberstlieutenant over Vores Liv-Guarde				Oberst-Lieutenant af Garderne	Schout by Nacht			Oberst-Lieutenant af Lif-Regimenterne og Artolleriet	Commandeur til Søes
Fifth class	General-Qvarteermester				Oberst-Lieutenant af Lif-Regimenterne og Artolleriet					
Fifth class	Oberstlieutenant				Oberst-Lieutenant				Oberst-Lieutenant	
Fifth class	Major				Major af Garderne				Major af Garderne	
Fifth class					General-Qvarteer-Mester				General-Qvarteer-Mester	
Sixth class					Major over Lif-Regimenterne og Artolleriet	Commandeur-Capitain til Søes			Major over Lif-Regimenterne og Artolleriet	Commandeur-Capitain til Søes
Sixth class					Major				Major	
Sixth class					Ritmester og Capitain af Garderne				Ritmester og Capitain af Garderne	
Sixth class					General-Qvarter-Mester-Lieutenanter				General-Qvarteer-Mester-Lieutenant	
Seventh class					Ritmester og Capitain ved Lif-Regimenterne og Artolleriet				Ritmester og Capitain	Capitain
Seventh class					Ritmester/ Capitain-Lieutenanter ved Garderne, Capitainer til Lands	Capitain				
Seventh class					Premier-Lieutenanter ved Garderne				Premier-Lieutenant ved Garderne	
Eight class									Premier-Lieutenant	
Eight class									Second Lieutenant ved Garderne	
Eight class									Second Lieutenant	
Eight class									Cornet og Fendrich ved Garderne	
Eight class									Cornet og Fendrich	
