= Princess Caroline-Mathilde of Denmark =

Danish princess (1912–1995)

Caroline-Mathilde
- Hereditary Princess of Denmark
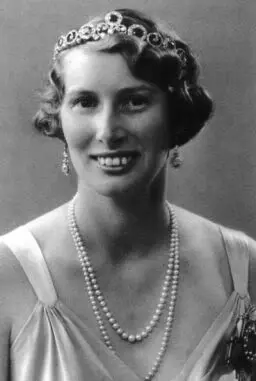
- Born: 27 April 1912; Jægersborghus, (Note: Today, Jægersborghus is known under the name of Schæffergården.) Gentofte, Denmark
- Died: 12 December 1995 (aged 83); Sorgenfri Palace, Lyngby-Taarbæk, Copenhagen, Denmark
- Burial: Roskilde Cathedral
- Spouse: Knud, Hereditary Prince of Denmark (m. 1933; died 1976)
- Issue: Princess Elisabeth; Count Ingolf of Rosenborg; Count Christian of Rosenborg
Names
- Caroline-Mathilde Louise Dagmar Christine Maud Augusta Ingeborg Thyra Adelaide
- House: Glücksburg
- Father: Prince Harald of Denmark
- Mother: Princess Helena of Schleswig-Holstein-Sonderburg-Glücksburg

Princess Caroline-Mathilde of Denmark (Caroline-Mathilde Louise Dagmar Christine Maud Augusta Ingeborg Thyra Adelheid; 27 April 1912 – 12 December 1995) was a daughter of Prince Harald of Denmark and granddaughter of King Frederik VIII of Denmark. As the wife of Knud, Hereditary Prince of Denmark, she became Hereditary Princess of Denmark.

== Early life ==
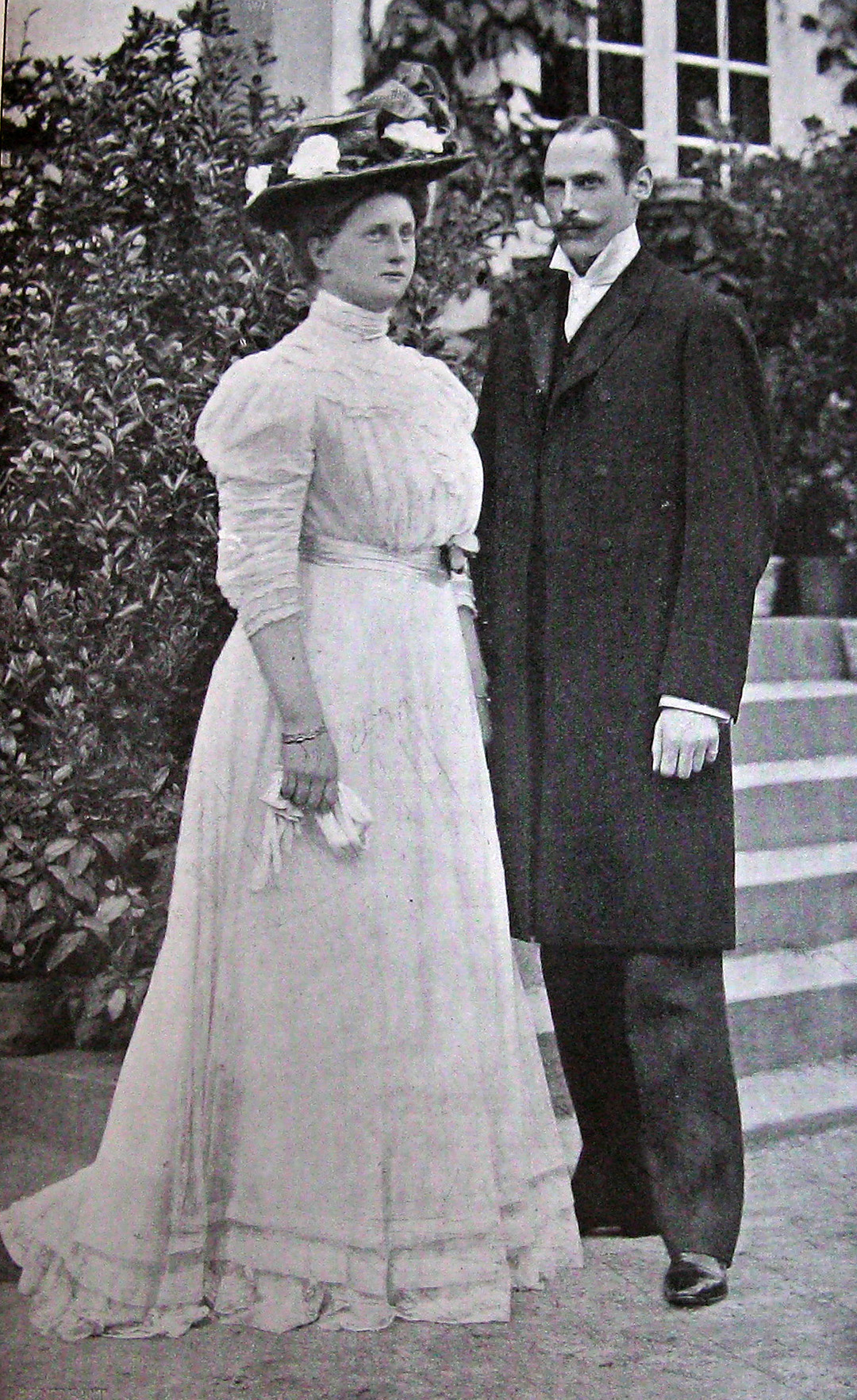
Caroline-Mathilde's parents: Prince Harald and Princess Helena in 1909

Princess Caroline-Mathilde was born on 27 April 1912 at the Jægersborghus country house, her parents' residence in Jægersborg north of Copenhagen, Denmark. She was the second child and daughter of Prince Harald of Denmark, son of King Frederik VIII of Denmark and Princess Louise of Sweden. Her mother was Princess Helena of Schleswig-Holstein-Sonderburg-Glücksburg, daughter of Friedrich Ferdinand, Duke of Schleswig-Holstein-Sonderburg-Glücksburg and Princess Karoline Mathilde of Schleswig-Holstein-Sonderburg-Augustenburg.

The princess was named for her maternal grandmother. She was baptised with the names Caroline Mathilde Louise Dagmar Christine Maud Augusta Ingeborg Thyra Adelheid and was known as 'Calma' to her family.

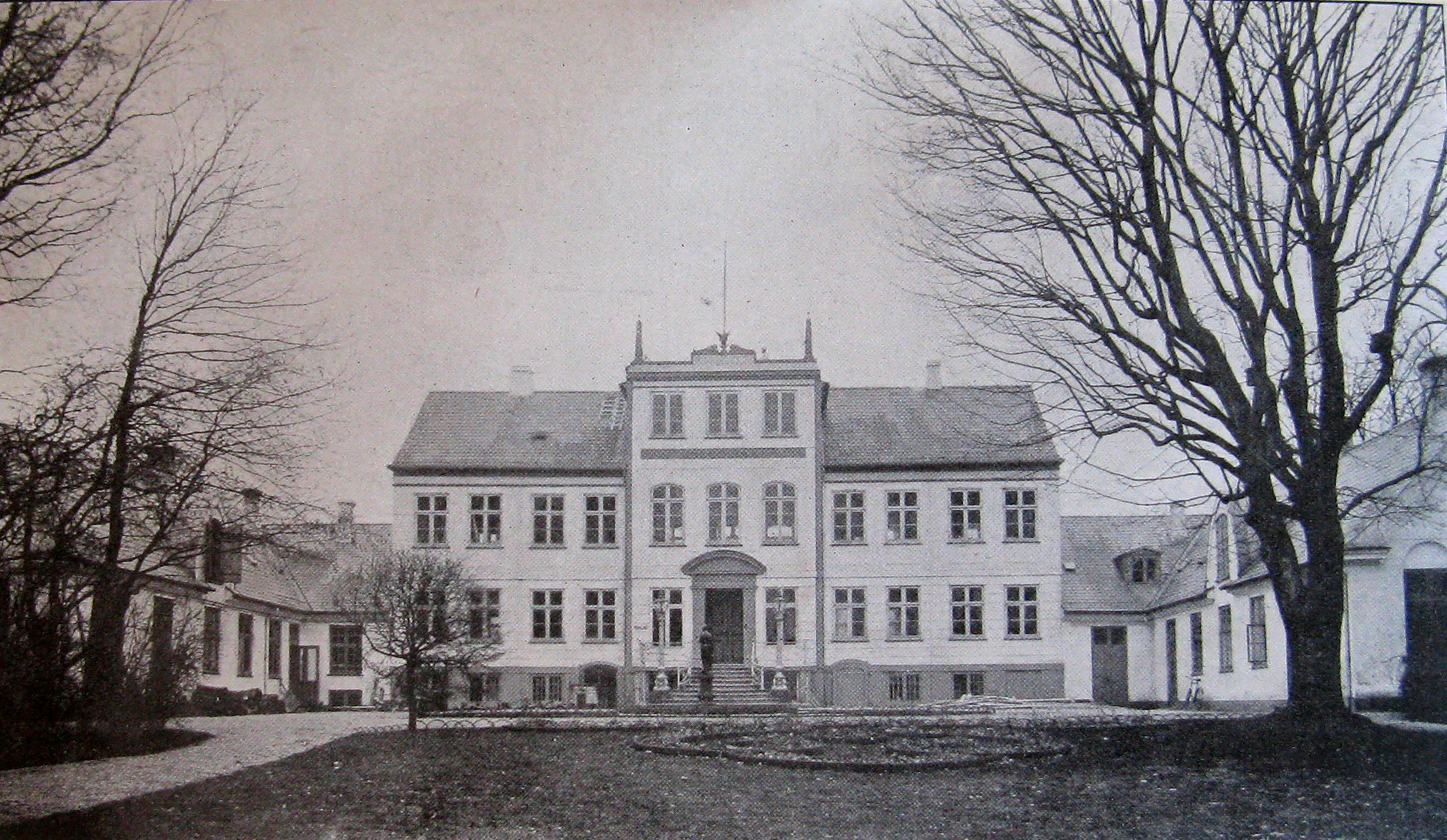
Princess Caroline-Mathilde's birthplace, Jægersborghus, in 1909

Princess Caroline-Mathilde grew up with her two sisters, Princess Feodora and Princess Alexandrine-Louise, and two brothers, Prince Gorm and Prince Oluf. For the first eight years of her life, the family lived at Jægersborghus. From 1918 the family lived in a villa at Svanemøllevej in the neighbourhood of Ryvangen in the district of Østerbro in Copenhagen.

At the age of 18, the photography-interested Princess Caroline-Mathilde was apprenticed to photographer Anne Marie Lindequist.

== Engagement and marriage ==
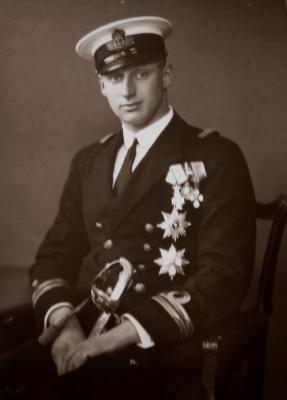
Prince Knud of Denmark in 1935

On 27 January 1933, at the age of 20, Princess Caroline-Mathilde was engaged to her first cousin, the 32-year-old Prince Knud of Denmark. Prince Knud was the second son and youngest child of King Christian X of Denmark and Alexandrine of Mecklenburg-Schwerin, and their fathers were brothers. The wedding was celebrated on 8 September 1933 at the chapel of Fredensborg Palace in North Zealand, Denmark.

After the wedding, they were given a side wing of Sorgenfri Palace, located on the shores of the small river Mølleåen in Kongens Lyngby north of Copenhagen, as their residence. Here they created a home for their three children: Princess Elisabeth (born in 1935), Prince Ingolf (born in 1940) and Prince Christian (born in 1944).

The couple lived the rest of their lives at Sorgenfri Palace. In 1944, Prince Knud inherited Egelund House near Fredensborg in North Zealand from his uncle, Prince Gustav of Denmark, which the couple then used as their summer residence until the hereditary prince sold it to the Danish Employers' Association in 1954. In 1952, Prince Knud also inherited his parents' holiday residence Klitgaarden in Skagen in North Jutland from his mother, Queen Alexandrine, which the couple then used as their holiday home, and remained in the family's possession until 1997.

== Later life ==
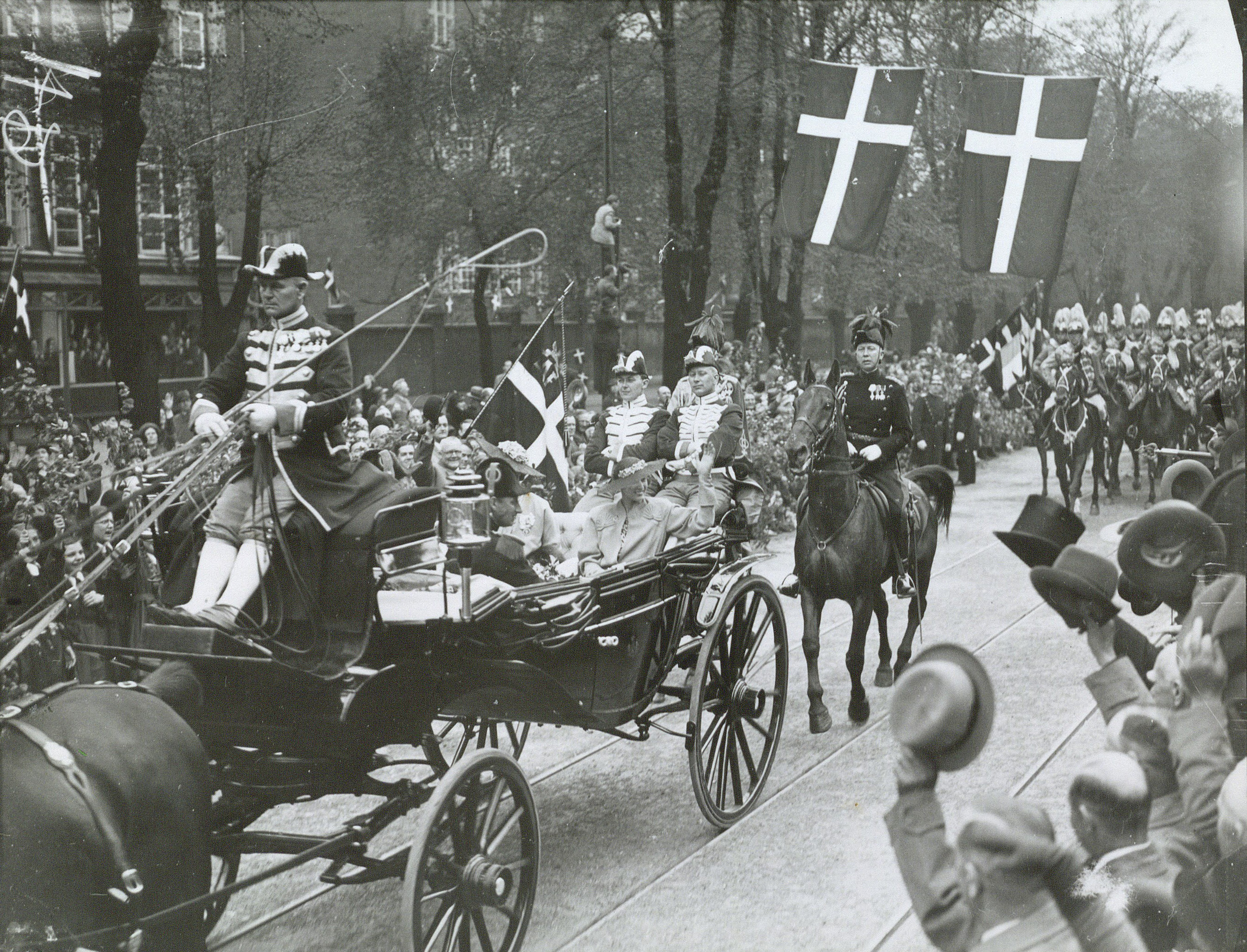
The silver jubilee of King Christian X in 1937. Prince Knud and Princess Caroline-Mathilde can be seen in the landau.

Not wanting to play a prominent public role, the princess led a relatively quiet life. She was involved in various charitable work, most prominently in support of the Danish minority in Germany.

From 1947 to 1953, Prince Knud was heir presumptive of his older brother King Frederik IX. Knud would have become king and Caroline Mathilde queen in their turn, but a change in the constitution in 1953 caused Knud to lose his place in the line of succession to his niece, Margrethe II. After the change, Prince Knud was given the title of Hereditary Prince and Caroline Mathilde became Hereditary Princess.

Hereditary Prince Knud died on 14 June 1976. Hereditary Princess Caroline Mathilde survived her husband by 19 years and died on 12 December 1995 at Sorgenfri Palace. She was interred next to her husband in Roskilde Cathedral on the island of Zealand, the traditional burial site for Danish monarchs since the 15th century.

== Honours ==
The Princess Caroline-Mathilde Alps in Greenland were named in her honour by the 1938–39 Mørkefjord Expedition, as her husband, Prince Knud, had been the patron of the expedition.

- Denmark:
  - Knight Grand Cross with Collar of the Order of the Elephant
  - Dame of the Royal Family Decoration of King Christian X, 2nd Class
  - Recipient of the Red Cross Medal of Honour
  - Recipient of the Red Cross Medal of Merit
  - Recipient of the 100th Anniversary Medal of the Birth of King Frederik VIII
  - Recipient of the 100th Anniversary Medal of the Birth of King Christian X
  - Recipient of the 50th Birthday Medal of Queen Margrethe II
  - Recipient of the Silver Anniversary Medal of Queen Margrethe II and Prince Henrik

== Issue ==
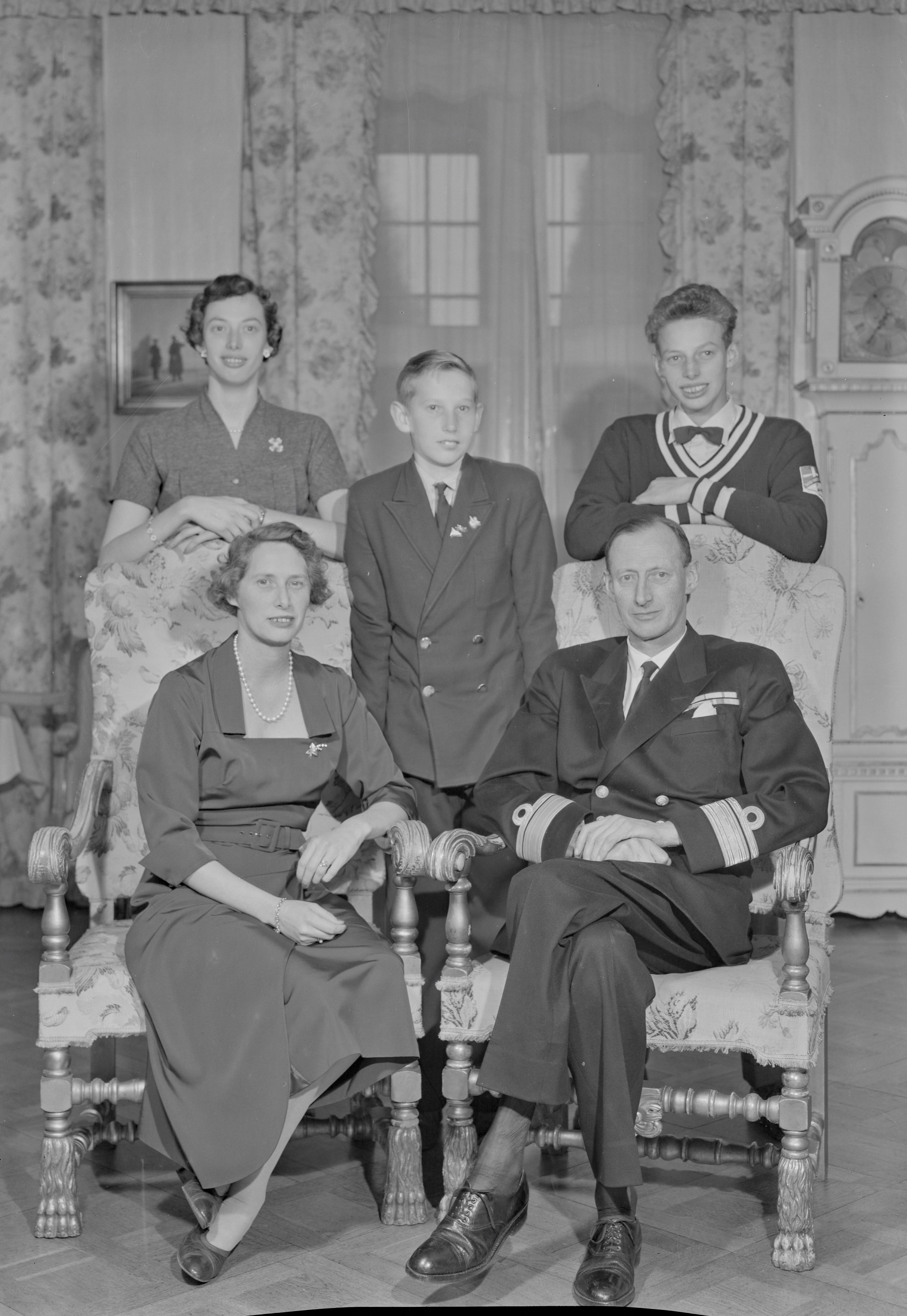
Princess Caroline-Mathilde with family (1956)

- Princess Elisabeth Caroline-Mathilde Alexandrine Helena Olga Thyra Feodora Estrid Margarethe Désirée (8 May 1935 – 19 June 2018). She never married nor had children.
- Prince Ingolf Christian Frederik Knud Harald Gorm Gustav Viggo Valdemar Aage of Denmark (born 17 February 1940). Lost his title and became His Excellency Major Count Ingolf of Rosenborg after marrying without royal consent to Inge Terney. He has no issue.
- Prince Christian Frederik Franz Knud Harald Carl Oluf Gustav Georg Erik of Denmark (22 October 1942 – 22 May 2013). Lost his title and became His Excellency Count Christian of Rosenborg after marrying without consent to Anne Dorte Maltoft-Nielsen. He had three daughters, Countess Josephine, Countess Camilla, and Countess Feodora.
  - Countess Josephine Caroline Elisabeth of Rosenborg (b. Frederikssund, 29 October 1972), married firstly in Lyngby on 3 October 1998 Thomas Christian Schmidt (b. Copenhagen, 22 April 1970), and had two children, married secondly on 6 August 2019 Kenneth Schmidt, without issue.
    - Julius Christian Emil Schmidt (b. 1 December 2001)
    - Clara Dorthe Elisabeth Schmidt (b. 28 November 2004)
  - Countess Camilla Alexandrine Cristine of Rosenborg (b. Frederikssund, 29 October 1972), married firstly in Søllerød Kirke, Søllerød, on 18 May 1995 Mikael Rosanes (b. 8 February 1952), and had four children, married secondly on 25 Aug 2018 Ivan Ottesen, without issue
    - Anastasia Caroline Amalie Rosanes (b. 24 November 1997)
    - Ludwig Christian Mikael Rosanes (b. 5 June 2000)
    - Leopold Christian Ingolf Rosanes (b. 15 April 2005)
    - Theodor Christian John Rosanes (b. 19 June 2008)
  - Countess Feodora Mathilde Helena of Rosenborg (b. Frederikssund, 27 February 1975), married firstly at Holmens Kirke, in Copenhagen, on 31 July 2004 and divorced in 2006 Eric Hervé Patrice Patte (b. Pont-à-Mousson, 20 Aug 1976), without issue, married secondly in Copenhagen on 8 September 2008 Morten Rønnow (b. Tärnby, 18 June 1968), with issue
    - Caroline-Mathilde Margrethe Rønnow (b. 1 February 2009)

== See also ==
- Descendants of Christian IX of Denmark - Lists members of European royalty who share a common ancestor with Princess Caroline-Mathilde of Denmark
