= Prince Christian =

Prince Christian may refer to:

== Living people ==
- Christian, Crown Prince of Denmark (born 2005), heir apparent to the Danish throne, son of King Frederik X and Queen Mary
- Prince Christian of Hanover (born 1985)

== Deceased people ==
- Christian, Prince-Elect of Denmark (1603–1647), heir apparent to the Danish throne
- Christian August of Holstein-Gottorp, Prince of Eutin (1673–1726), Duke of Schleswig-Holstein and Prince of the Holy Roman Empire
- Prince Christian Charles of Schleswig-Holstein-Sonderburg-Plön-Norburg (1673–1706)
- Christian August, Prince of Anhalt-Zerbst (1690–1747), father of Catherine II of Russia
- Christian August II, Duke of Schleswig-Holstein-Sonderburg-Augustenburg (1798–1869), father of Prince Christian of Schleswig-Holstein, husband of Princess Helena of the United Kingdom
- Prince Christian of Schleswig-Holstein (1831–1917), husband of Princess Helena of the United Kingdom
- Prince Christian Victor of Schleswig-Holstein (1867–1900), son of the above, grandson of Victoria of the United Kingdom
- Prince Christian of Schaumburg-Lippe (1898–1974), son of Princess Louise of Denmark, younger sister of Christian X of Denmark
- Count Christian of Rosenborg (1942–2013), born Prince Christian of Denmark; son of Prince Knud of Denmark, second son of Christian X of Denmark

== See also ==
- Christian Prince (disambiguation)
