= Act of Succession (Denmark) =

1953 Danish law on succession to the throne

Tronfølgeloven
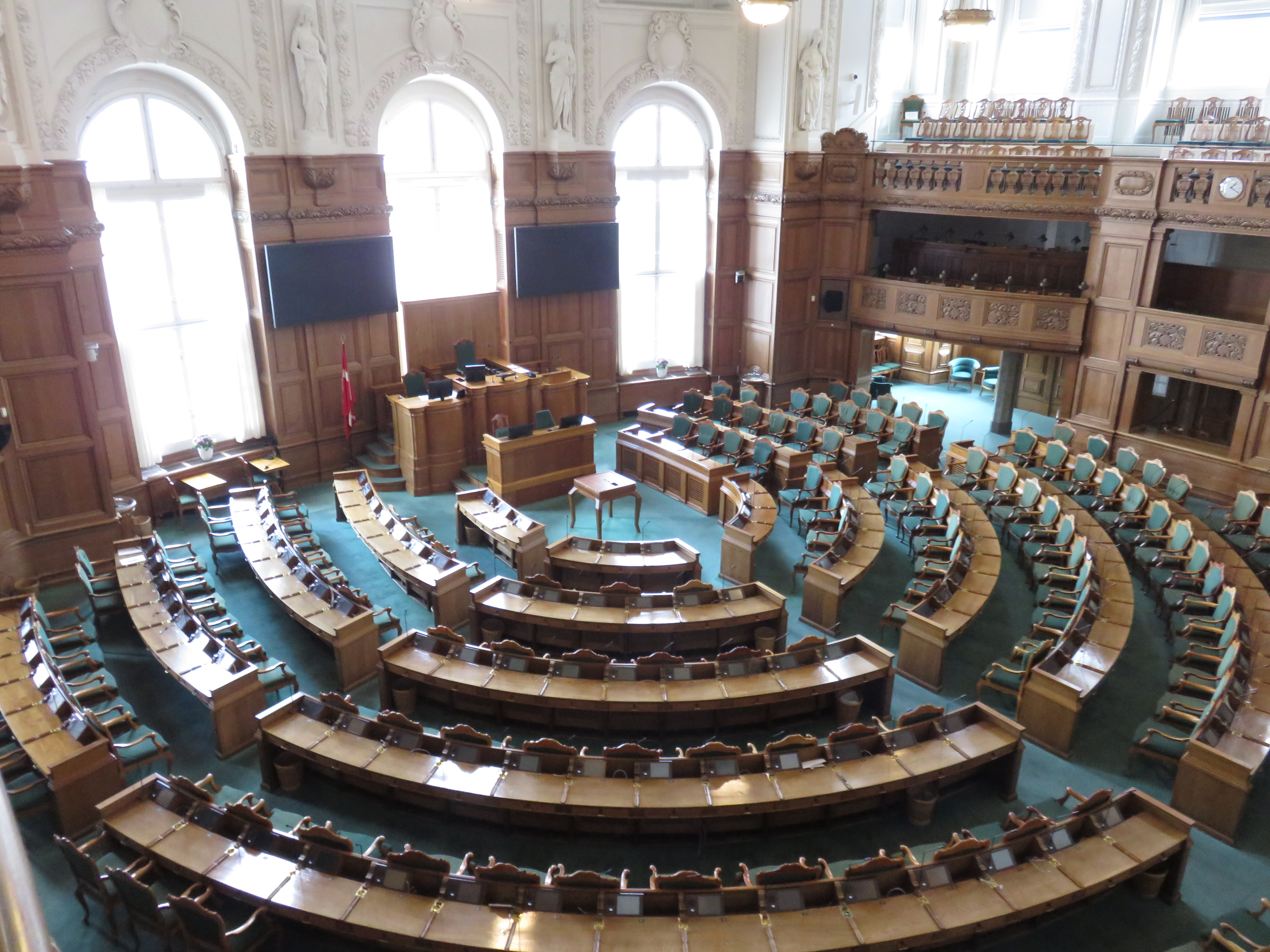

Folketing
- Long title: Bekendtgørelse af tronfølgeloven
- Citation: Retsinformation
- Passed: 2 June 2006
- Voting summary: 128 voted for
- Status: Current legislation

The Act of Succession of 27 March 1953 (Danish: tronfølgeloven) is an act adopted after a 1953 referendum in Denmark and dictates the rules governing the succession to the Danish throne. The 1953 referendum changed the act so that it became possible for a woman to inherit the throne if she has no brothers, a system known as male-preference cognatic preference primogeniture. As the reigning King Frederik IX had three daughters and no sons, this made Princess Margrethe heiress presumptive to the throne, replacing her uncle Prince Knud. As Frederik IX's wife Queen Ingrid was not expected to (and did not) have any more children, this effectively ensured that Princess Margrethe would become Queen of Denmark, which she did in 1972. The act also removed the succession rights of minor members of the House of Glücksburg.

Following a referendum in 2009, the Act of Succession was amended so that primogeniture no longer puts males over females, meaning the first-born child would become heir apparent to the throne regardless of gender. The expected result of the referendum was on the balance, since 40% of the entire electorate had to vote yes in order to make the change. However, the succession amendment was confirmed by a larger turnout especially in rural areas. The change of the act had no effect on the expected line of succession at the time, but would affect the line of succession among the then Crown Prince Frederik's younger children, putting Princess Isabella (who was born in 2007) ahead of her younger brother Prince Vincent (born in 2011).
