= Count Ingolf of Rosenborg =

Relative of the Danish monarchy

Ingolf
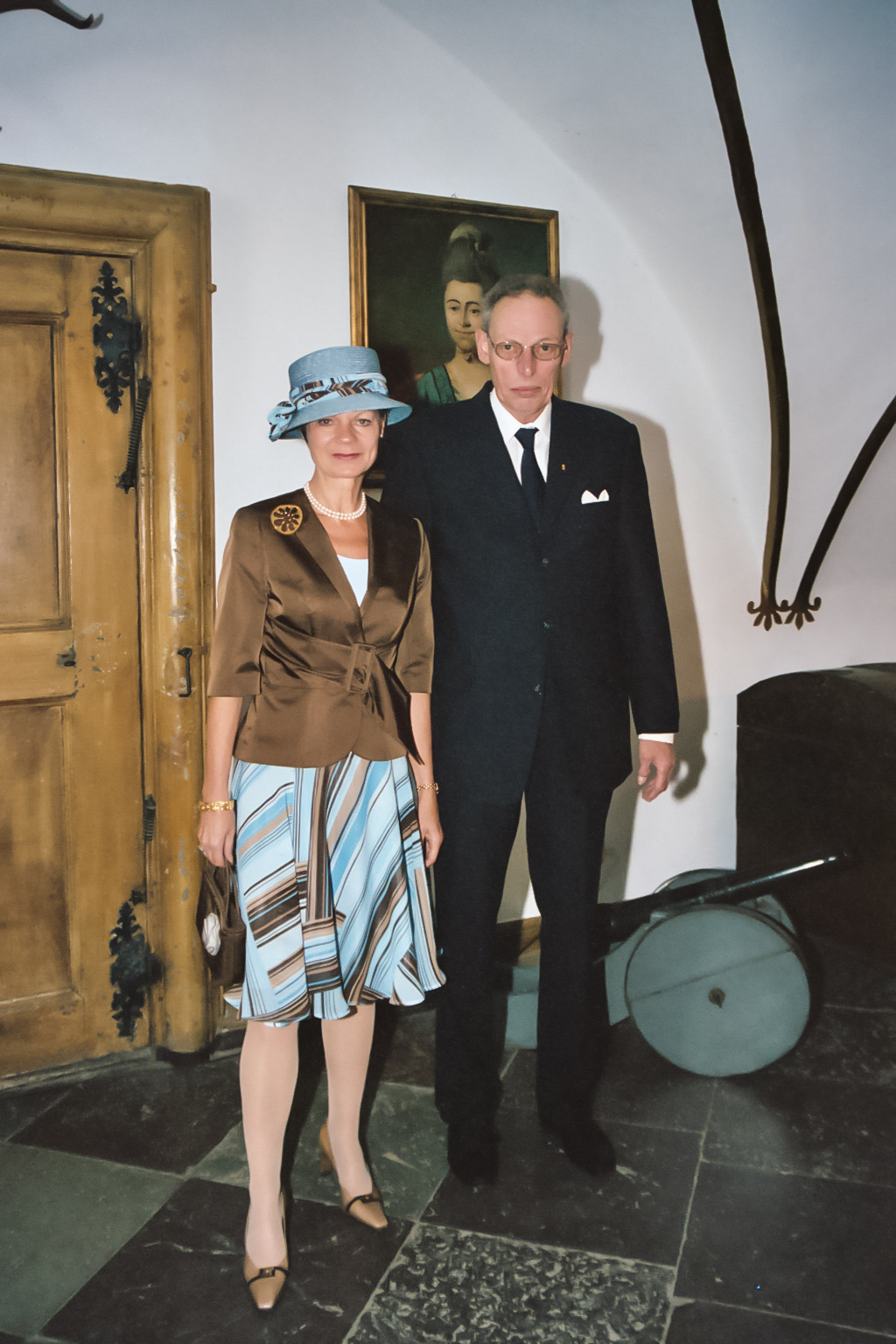
- Ingolf and his wife Sussie in 2005
- Born: Prince Ingolf of Denmark; 17 February 1940 (age 86); Sorgenfri Palace, Lyngby-Taarbæk, Denmark
- Spouse: Inge Terney (m. 1968; died 1996) Sussie Hjorhøy (m. 1998)
Names
- Ingolf Christian Frederik Knud Harald Gorm Gustav Viggo Valdemar Aage
- House: Glücksburg
- Father: Knud, Hereditary Prince of Denmark
- Mother: Princess Caroline-Mathilde of Denmark

Count Ingolf of Rosenborg RE (born 17 February 1940) is a Danish count and former prince.

Born Prince Ingolf of Denmark (Danish: Prins Ingolf Christian Frederik Knud Harald Gorm Gustav Viggo Valdemar Aage til Danmark), he appeared likely to some day become king until the constitution was changed in 1953 to allow females to inherit the crown, placing his branch of the dynasty behind that of his first cousin Princess Margrethe and her two younger sisters. He later gave up his princely rank and his rights to the throne in order to marry a commoner.

He is a landlord in Egeland Gods, Øster Starup Kolding.

== Family ==
Ingolf was born at Sorgenfri Palace, Sorgenfri, as His Highness Prince Ingolf of Denmark. He was the elder son of Hereditary Prince Knud, by his wife and first cousin, Hereditary Princess Caroline-Mathilde.

== Loss of place in succession ==
From the 1947 death of his grandfather, Christian X of Denmark, Ingolf stood only behind his father in the order of hereditary succession to the throne and was expected to become king in his turn. His father, Prince Knud, was then the heir presumptive, due to succeed Ingolf's uncle King Frederik IX, who had three daughters but no sons.

In 1953, the Constitution of Denmark was amended to allow cognatic primogeniture. The new law made thirteen-year-old Princess Margrethe the new heir presumptive, placing her and her two sisters before Prince Knud and his family in the succession. Ingolf was thus relegated to fifth in the line of succession to the Danish throne, but more importantly, he now ranked behind Margrethe and others who were likely to have dynastic children of their own (as has, in fact, happened). The princess became Queen Margrethe II in 1972 and reigned until 2024. Ingolf's place in the line of succession, were he still eligible, would be no higher than eleventh today.

== Loss of dynastic rights ==
In 1968, now with little hope of ascending the throne, Ingolf chose to forfeit his right of succession to the throne by marrying without having received the royal assent of the monarch in the Council of State. The king's permission to marry was not sought because it was expected to be denied, since Ingolf's fiancée was an untitled commoner. Though Frederik IX had liberalized traditional practice by allowing royal spouses who were not themselves royal, but who claimed noble blood and were known by courtesy titles (Anne Bowes-Lyon was the granddaughter of an earl and through her first marriage to the son of an earl bore the title of viscountess; Henri de Laborde de Monpezat used the title of count, though his family's claim to nobility was later acknowledged to be flawed), it would not be until 1995 that Margrethe II would allow her children to marry commoners with neither title nor claim to noble blood. Ingolf was given the title count of Rosenborg and the style of Excellency, as was customary in the 20th century for Danish princes who forfeited their dynastic rights.

Prior to his son's wedding, Prince Knud sought to convince his brother that Ingolf should be allowed to retain his royal title after marriage. But the king refused, on the grounds that other males of the dynasty who had been demoted to counts of Rosenborg upon marriage might try to reclaim their royal rank if Ingolf were allowed to do so, despite marrying a commoner as they had done. So, in 1968, Ingolf forfeited his rights to the throne and took the title count of Rosenborg. His younger brother Christian did the same three years later.

Ingolf married firstly Inge Terney (21 January 1938 in Copenhagen – 21 July 1996 in Velje), daughter of Georg Terney (1906–1977), hardware storer, and wife Jenny Kamilla Hansen (1908–1990), on 13 January 1968, at Kongens Lyngby Kirke, Kongens Lyngby, Denmark. After being widowed, he married secondly Sussie Hjorhøy-Pedersen (born 20 February 1950 in Copenhagen), daughter of Frederick Walter Pedersen and wife Ruth Hjorhøy, who thus became "Her Excellency Countess Sussie of Rosenborg" on 7 March 1998, at Egtved, Denmark. He has no children. Ingolf is godfather to his grandnephew, Leopold Rosanes af Rosenborg, who is the grandson of his brother Christian.

== Public role ==
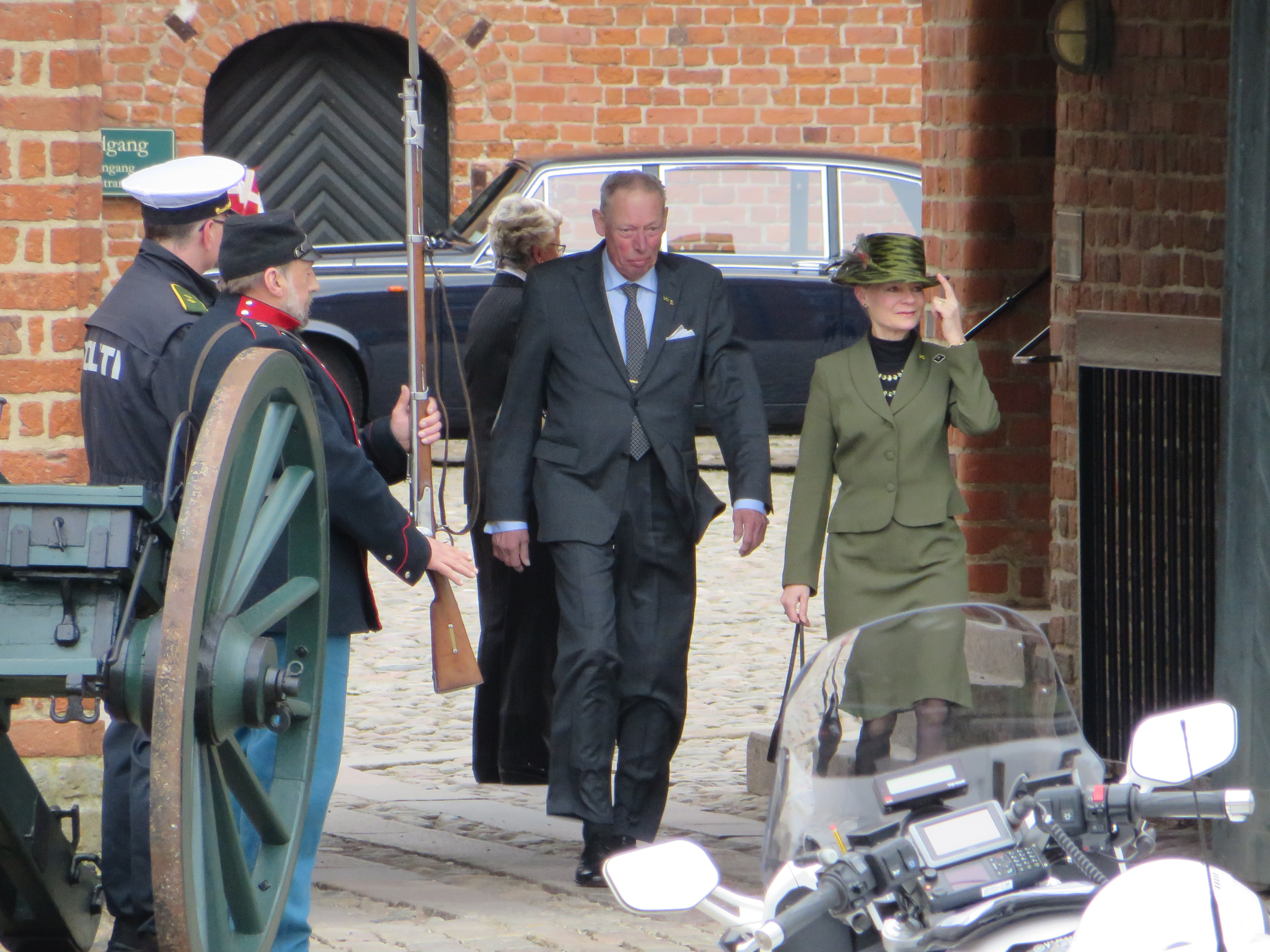
Count Ingolf of Rosenborg and Countess Sussie, Sønderborg Castle, 18 April 2014

Count Ingolf usually takes part in major public events associated with the royal family; he and Countess Sussie attended the May 2004 wedding of Crown Prince Frederik at Copenhagen Cathedral, and the subsequent reception at Fredensborg Palace. They also attended the memorial service in honour of his great-grandaunt Empress Maria Feodorovna of Russia held on 22 September 2006. On some occasions, they are listed as members of the royal family, such as when they attended the wedding of Prince Joachim in 2008 and the luncheon to celebrate the 75th birthday of Prince Henrik at Fredensborg Palace on 11 June 2009 On other occasions, such as the celebrations for the Queen's 70th birthday, they are listed along with non-royal guests, but even in these cases at the ceremonies themselves they are usually given precedence immediately after his sister Princess Elisabeth of Denmark. Count Ingolf and Countess Sussie attended the Queen's ruby-jubilee (40th-anniversary) celebrations. In 1964, when still Prince Ingolf, he acted as groomsman to his third cousin, Constantine II of Greece, on his marriage to Princess Anne-Marie of Denmark (also Ingolf's first cousin).

According to Jyllands-Posten, he carries out official engagements around 200 days of the year, typically relating to agriculture and defence, mostly in Jutland.

Ingolf receives an annual allowance of 1.4 million kroner according to the Danish Royal House website. His sister, Princess Elisabeth, did not receive such an allowance, though she remained in the line of succession. His brother did not receive it either.
