= Knud, Hereditary Prince of Denmark =

Danish prince (1900–1976)

Knud
- Hereditary Prince of Denmark
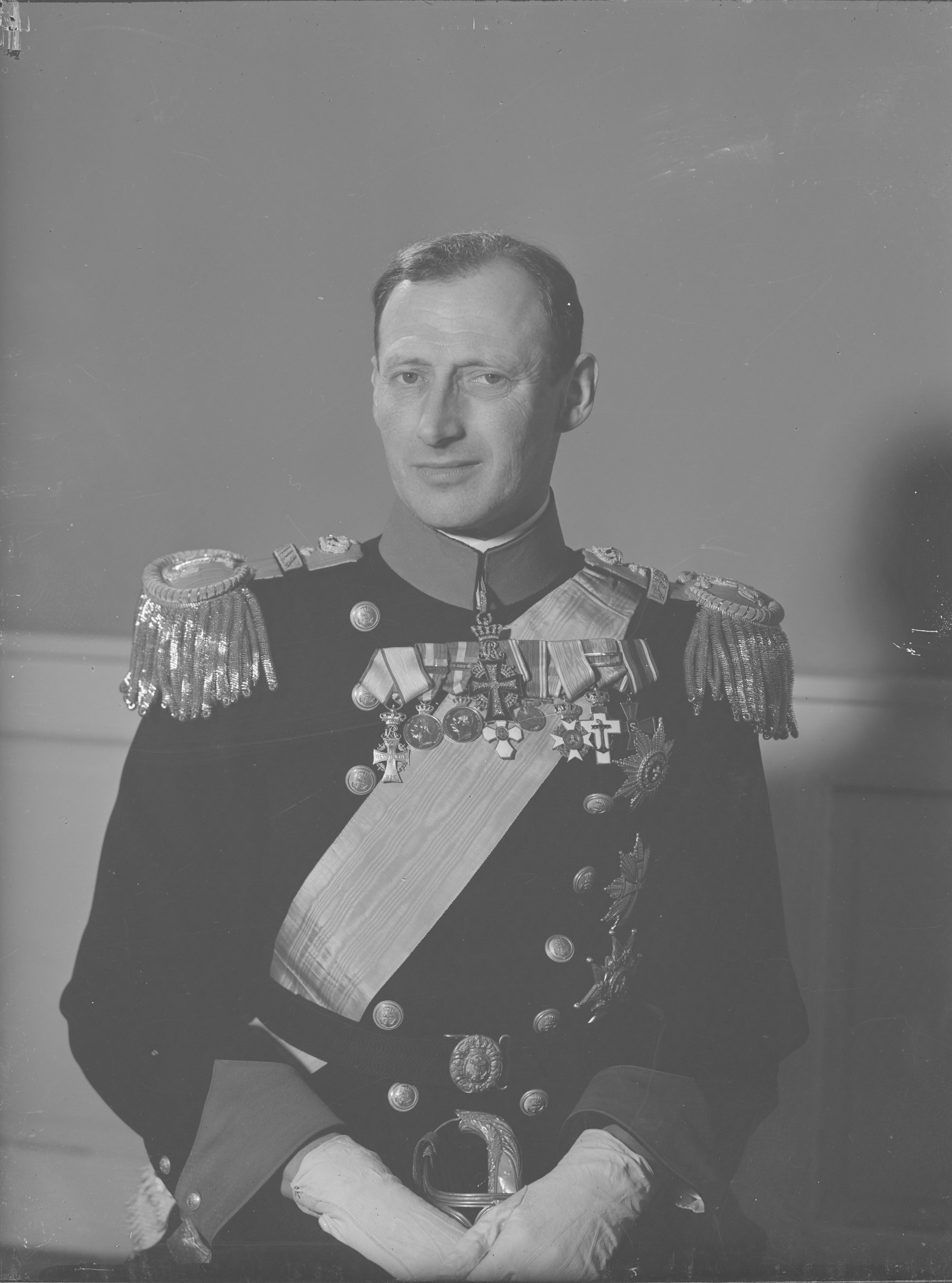
- Knud in 1949
- Born: 27 July 1900; Sorgenfri Palace, Lyngby-Taarbæk, Copenhagen, Denmark
- Died: 14 June 1976 (aged 75); Copenhagen, Denmark
- Burial: Roskilde Cathedral
- Spouse: Princess Caroline-Mathilde of Denmark (m. 1933)
- Issue: Princess Elisabeth; Count Ingolf of Rosenborg; Count Christian of Rosenborg
Names
- Knud Christian Frederik Michael
- House: Glücksburg
- Father: Christian X of Denmark
- Mother: Alexandrine of Mecklenburg-Schwerin

Knud, Hereditary Prince of Denmark (Knud Christian Frederik Michael; 27 July 1900 – 14 June 1976) was a member of the Danish royal family, the younger son and child of King Christian X and Queen Alexandrine.

From 1947 to 1953, he was heir presumptive to his older brother, King Frederik IX, and would have succeeded him as king following his death in January 1972 had it not been for a change in the Danish Act of Succession that replaced him with his niece, Queen Margrethe II. Later, Knud's two sons, Ingolf and Christian, were stripped of their titles of prince and removed from the line of succession by the new law because they had married commoners without asking consent from their uncle.

== Early life ==
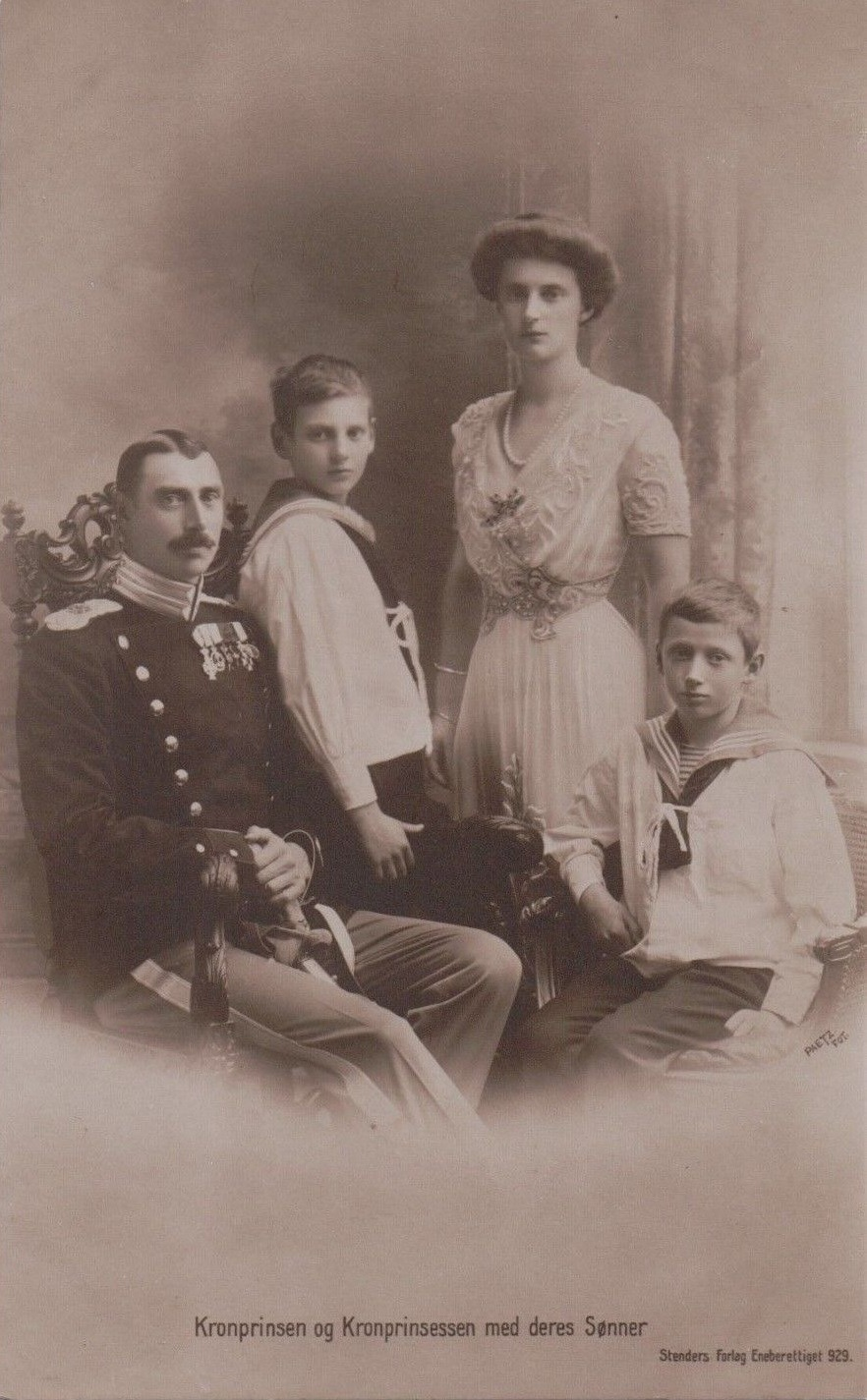
King Christian X, Queen Alexandrine and their two sons, Crown Prince Frederik and Prince Knud in 1912.

Prince Knud was born on 27 July 1900 at his parents' country residence, the Sorgenfri Palace, located on the shores of the small river Mølleåen in Kongens Lyngby north of Copenhagen on the island of Zealand in Denmark, during the reign of his great-grandfather King Christian IX. His parents were Prince Christian of Denmark, son of the heir apparent Crown Prince Frederik of Denmark, and Alexandrine of Mecklenburg-Schwerin. Knud's only sibling, Prince Frederik, had been born one year before him.

Christian IX died on 29 January 1906, and Knud's grandfather succeeded him as Frederik VIII. Six years later, on 14 May 1912, Frederik VIII died, and Knud's father ascended the throne as Christian X.

As was customary for princes at that time, Knud started a military education and entered the naval college.

== Engagement and marriage ==
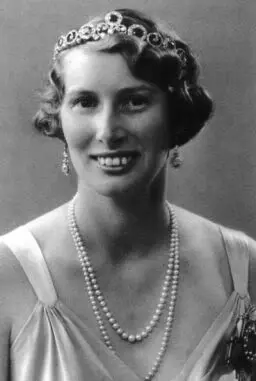
Princess Caroline-Mathilde of Denmark.

On 27 January 1933, at the age of 32, Prince Knud was engaged to his first cousin, the 20-year-old Princess Caroline-Mathilde of Denmark. Princess Caroline-Mathilde was the second daughter of Prince Harald of Denmark and Princess Helena of Schleswig-Holstein-Sonderburg-Glücksburg, and their fathers were brothers. The wedding was celebrated on 8 September 1933 at the chapel of Fredensborg Palace in North Zealand, Denmark.

After the wedding, they were given a side wing of Sorgenfri Palace, Prince Knud's childhood home, as their residence. Here they created a home for their three children: Princess Elisabeth (born in 1935), Prince Ingolf (born in 1940) and Prince Christian (born in 1944).

The couple lived the rest of their lives at Sorgenfri Palace. In 1944, Prince Knud inherited Egelund House near Fredensborg in North Zealand from his uncle, Prince Gustav of Denmark, which the couple then used as their summer residence until the hereditary prince sold it to the Danish Employers' Association in 1954. In 1952, Prince Knud also inherited his parents' holiday residence Klitgaarden in Skagen in North Jutland from his mother, Queen Alexandrine, which the couple then used as their holiday home, and which remained in the family's possession until 1997.

== Heir presumptive ==
On 20 April 1947, Christian X died, and Knud's brother Frederick succeeded to the throne as Frederik IX. Since Frederik IX had fathered no sons and the Danish Act of Succession at the time followed the principle of agnatic primogeniture, Prince Knud became heir presumptive and first in line to succeed his brother as king.

Frederik IX had, however, fathered three daughters. In 1953, the Act of Succession was amended to follow the principle of male-preference primogeniture. The new law made Frederik IX's thirteen-year-old daughter Margrethe the new heir presumptive, placing her and her two sisters before Knud and his family in the line of succession.

== Later life and legacy ==
King Frederik IX died in 1972 and was succeeded by his daughter Queen Margrethe II. Prince Knud died in Gentofte on 14 June 1976. He was buried at Roskilde Cathedral. His widow died on 12 December 1995.

In 1953 a students' home in Frederiksberg was named "Arveprins Knuds Kollegium" in honor of Prince Knud. At the time, Prince Knud was protector of Sydslesvigsk Studie- og Hjælpefond (Study and relief fund of Southern Schleswig),(see Danish minority of Southern Schleswig), an area that could be considered the birthplace of the House of Schleswig-Holstein-Sonderburg-Glücksburg, the royal family of which Knud was a part.

The Princess Caroline-Mathilde Alps in Greenland were named by the 1938–39 Mørkefjord Expedition in his wife's honour for Prince Knud had been the patron of the expedition.

The popular saying "En gang til for Prins Knud" ("One more time for Prince Knud") is sometimes used when repeating or clarifying because the interlocutor is a bit slow-witted or didn't immediately grasp something. The expression was first used in an article by Bent Thorndahl in the Copenhagen newspaper Politiken to describe the 24 November 1958 premiere, at the Falkoner Center in Frederiksberg, of the ballet "Det Forsinkede Stævnemøde" ("The postponed rendezvous"). Prince Knud and Princess Caroline Mathilde had sat in the former royal loge at the far left of the hall (i.e., stage right), but one especially memorable scene had not been fully visible from where they had sat. The ballet director, Ingvar Balduin Blicher-Hansen (1911–1995) persuaded the ballet ensemble to re-enact the scene for the royal couple. The following year, Birgitte Reimer, at the theatrical revue known as Cirkusrevyen, performed a song, written by Erik Leth to a tune by Sven Gyldmark, which immortalized Prince Knud, somewhat unfairly mocking him as supposedly being a dullard: “Så ta'r vi den en gang til for Prins Knud.” (“Now we'll do it one more time for Prince Knud.”)

== Issue ==
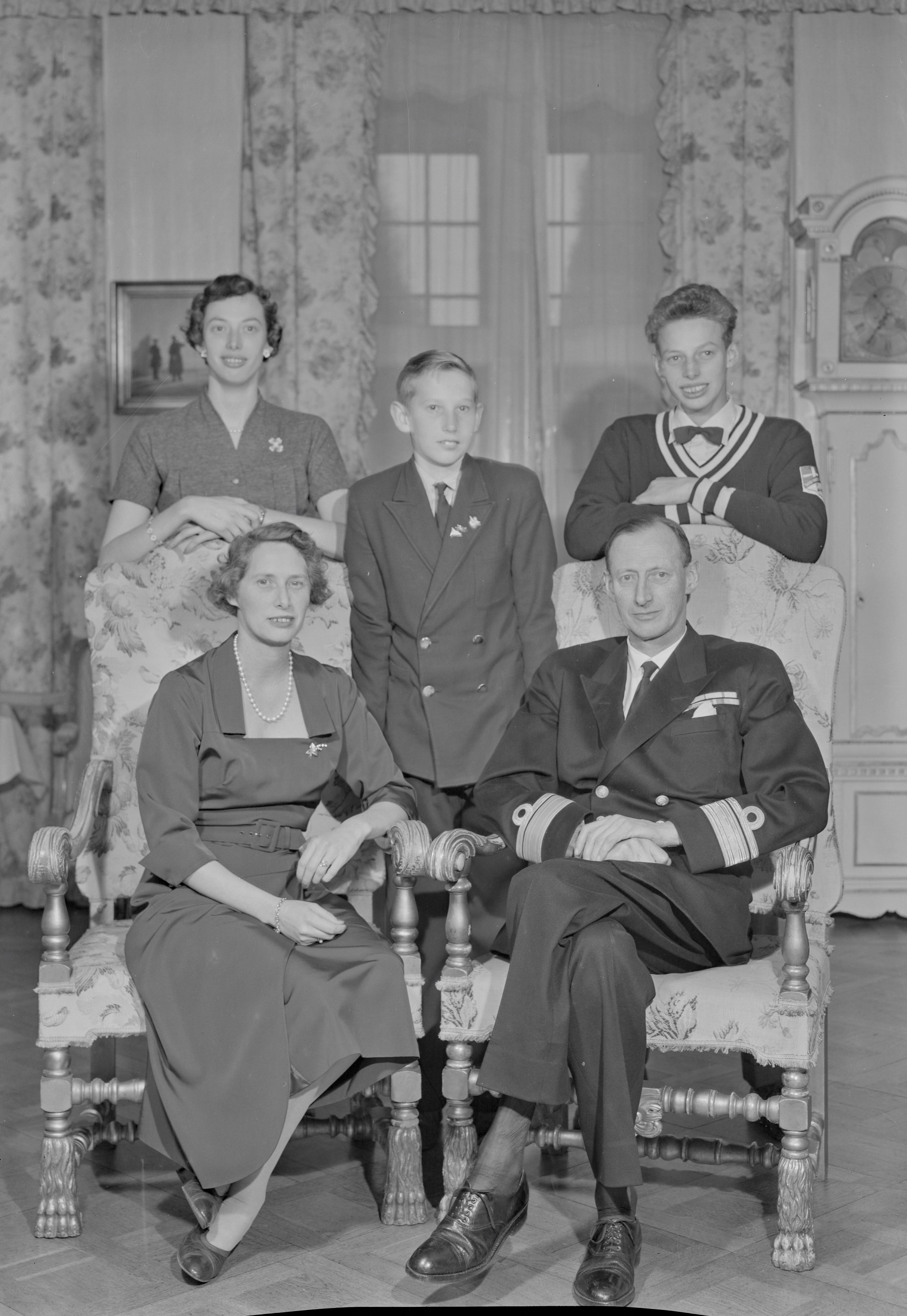
Prince Knud with family (1956)

- Princess Elisabeth Caroline-Mathilde Alexandrine Helena Olga Thyra Feodora Estrid Margarethe Désirée (8 May 1935 – 19 June 2018)
- Prince Ingolf Christian Frederik Knud Harald Gorm Gustav Viggo Valdemar Aage of Denmark (born 17 February 1940). Lost his title and became His Excellency Major Count Ingolf of Rosenborg after marrying without royal consent to Inge Terney, who passed away on 21 July 1996 (aged 58). He married secondly Sussie Hjorhøy. He has no issue.
- Prince Christian Frederik Franz Knud Harald Carl Oluf Gustav Georg Erik of Denmark (22 October 1942 – 22 May 2013). Lost his title and became His Excellency Count Christian of Rosenborg after marrying without consent to Anne Dorte Maltoft-Nielsen. The couple had 3 daughters:
  - Countess Josephine Caroline Elisabeth of Rosenborg (born 29 October 1972 in Frederikssund), married firstly Thomas Christian Schmidt (born 22 April 1970) in Lyngby on 3 October 1998, and had two children. Secondly, she married Kenneth Schmidt on 6 August 2019 and has one son.
    - Julius Christian Emil Schmidt (born 1 December 2001)
    - Clara Dorthe Elisabeth Schmidt (born 28 November 2004)
    - Oscar Christian Schmidt (born 6 October 2016)
  - Countess Camilla Alexandrine Cristine of Rosenborg (born 29 October 1972 in Frederikssun), married firstly Mikael Rosanes (born 8 February 1952) in Søllerød Kirke on 18 May 1995, and had four children. Secondly, she married Ivan Ottesen on 25 August 2018, without issue.
    - Anastasia Caroline Amalie Rosanes (born 24 November 1997)
    - Ludwig Christian Mikael Rosanes (born 5 June 2000)
    - Leopold Christian Ingolf Rosanes (born 15 April 2005)
    - Theodor Christian John Rosanes (born 19 June 2008)
  - Countess Feodora Mathilde Helena of Rosenborg (born 27 February 1975 in Frederikssund), married firstly Eric Hervé Patrice Patte (born 20 August 1976 in Pont-à-Mousson) at Holmens Kirke in Copenhagen on 31 July 2004. They divorced in 2006 without issue. Secondly, she married Morten Rønnow (born 18 June 1968 in Tårnby) on 8 September 2008, with issue:
    - Caroline-Mathilde Margrethe Rønnow (born 1 February 2009)

== Honours ==
Danish and Icelandic honours

- Knight of the Order of the Elephant, 14 May 1912
- Cross of Honour of the Order of the Dannebrog, 27 July 1918
- Grand Commander of the Order of the Dannebrog, 15 May 1937
- Grand Cross of the Order of the Falcon
- King Christian IX Centenary Medal
- King Frederik VIII Centenary Medal
- Navy Long Service Award

Foreign honours

- Belgium: Grand Cordon of the Order of Leopold
- Brazil: Grand Cross of the Order of the Southern Cross
- Ethiopian Empire: Grand Cross of the Order of the Star of Ethiopia
- Finland: Grand Cross of the Order of the White Rose of Finland
- France: Grand Cross of the Legion of Honour
- (Greece) Greek Royal Family:
  - Grand Cross of the Order of the Redeemer
  - Grand Cross of the Order of Saints George and Constantine
- (Kingdom of Italy) Italian Royal Family: Knight of the Supreme Order of the Most Holy Annunciation, 23 June 1922
- Empire of Japan: Grand Cordon of the Order of the Rising Sun, with Pawlownia Flowers
- Mecklenburg Grand Ducal Family: Grand Cross of the House Order of the Wendish Crown, with Crown in Ore
- Monaco: Grand Cross of the Order of Saint-Charles, 5 March 1936
- Netherlands: Grand Cross of the Order of the Netherlands Lion
- Norway: Grand Cross of the Royal Norwegian Order of St. Olav, with Collar, 31 October 1924
- Spain: Grand Cross of the Order of Naval Merit
- Sweden: Knight of the Royal Order of the Seraphim, 26 September 1926
- Thailand: Knight of the Order of the Royal House of Chakri, 13 February 1929

== Ancestors ==
Ancestors of Knud, Hereditary Prince of Denmark

8. Christian IX of Denmark
4. Frederik VIII of Denmark
9. Princess Louise of Hesse-Kassel
2. Christian X of Denmark
10. Charles XV of Sweden
5. Princess Louise of Sweden
11. Princess Louise of the Netherlands
1. Knud, Hereditary Prince of Denmark
12. Frederick Francis II, Grand Duke of Mecklenburg-Schwerin
6. Frederick Francis III, Grand Duke of Mecklenburg-Schwerin
13. Princess Augusta Reuss of Köstritz
3. Duchess Alexandrine of Mecklenburg-Schwerin
14. Grand Duke Michael Nikolaevich of Russia
7. Grand Duchess Anastasia Mikhailovna of Russia
15. Princess Cecilie of Baden

Knud, Hereditary Prince of Denmark House of Schleswig-Holstein-Sonderburg-Glücksburg Born: 27 July 1900 Died: 14 June 1979
Danish royalty
Preceded by Frederik as Crown Prince	Heir to the Danish throne 1947–1953	Succeeded by Princess Margrethe
