= Count Christian of Rosenborg =

Danish royal (1942–2013)

Christian
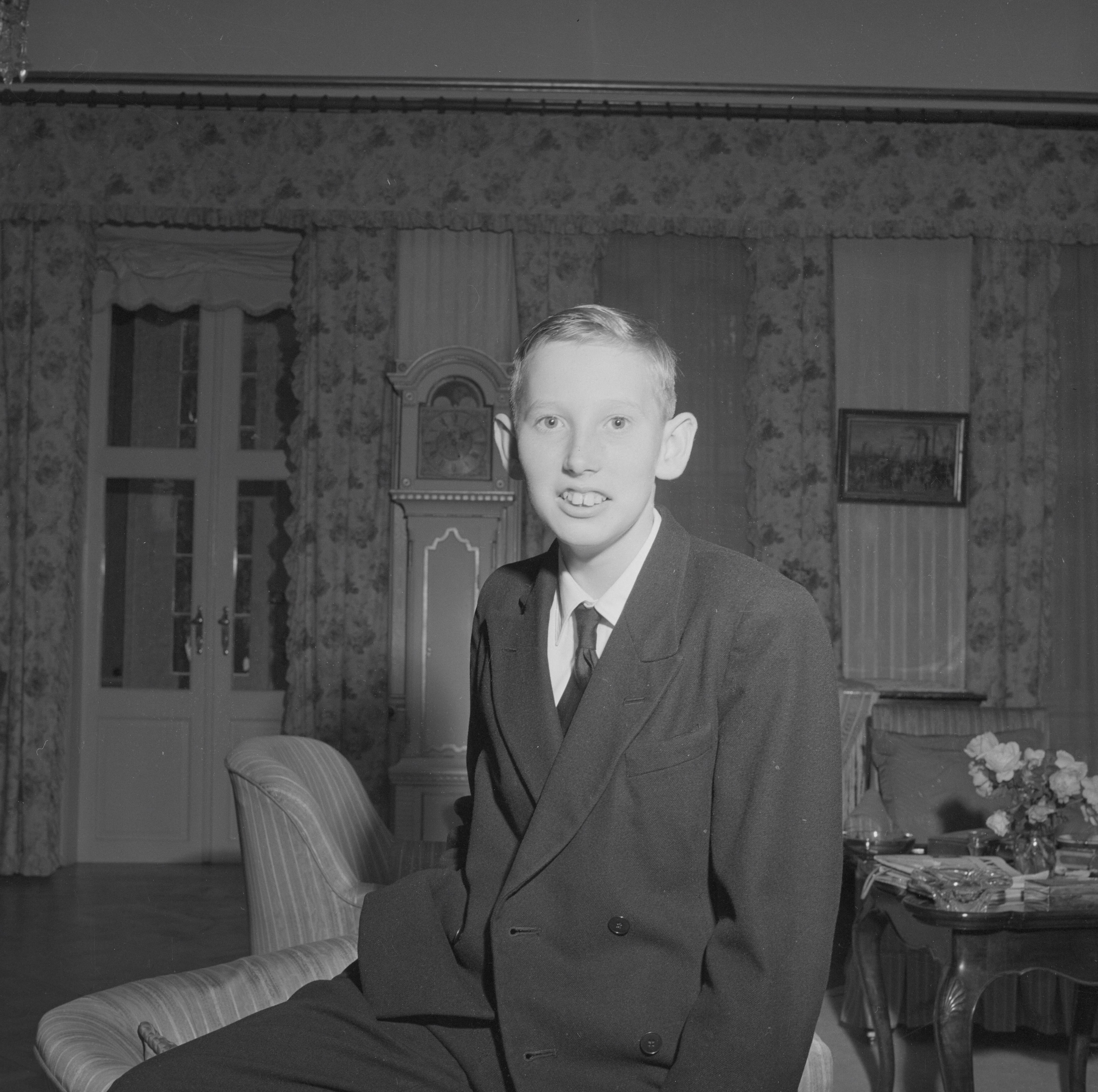
- Prince Christian, 1955
- Born: Prince Christian of Denmark; 22 October 1942; Sorgenfri Palace, Lyngby-Taarbæk, Copenhagen, Denmark
- Died: 21 May 2013 (aged 70); Gentofte Hospital, Copenhagen, Denmark
- Spouse: Anne Dorte Maltoft-Nielsen (m. 1971)
- Issue: Countess Josephine; Countess Camilla; Countess Feodora
Names
- Christian Frederik Franz Knud Harald Carl Oluf Gustav Georg Erik
- House: Glücksburg
- Father: Knud, Hereditary Prince of Denmark
- Mother: Princess Caroline-Mathilde of Denmark

Count Christian of Rosenborg (Christian Frederik Franz Knud Harald Carl Oluf Gustav Georg Erik; 22 October 1942 – 21 May 2013) was a member of the Danish royal family. Born Prince Christian of Denmark, from 1947 he was third in the line of line of succession until the constitution was changed in 1953 to allow females to inherit the crown, placing his branch of the dynasty behind that of his cousin Margrethe and her two younger sisters. He later gave up his princely rank and his rights to the throne in order to marry a commoner.

He was a War Captain in the Royal Danish Navy in Sorgenfri Palace, Sorgenfri.

== Family ==
He was born at Sorgenfri Palace, Sorgenfri, as the younger son of Hereditary Prince Knud by his wife and first cousin, Princess Caroline-Mathilde of Denmark.

== Loss of place in succession ==
From the death of his grandfather in 1947, Christian stood only behind his father and elder brother Prince Ingolf in the order of hereditary succession to the throne, with only future children of Ingolf possibly taking a place ahead of him. His father Prince Knud was then the heir presumptive, due to succeed Christian's uncle King Frederik IX, who had three daughters but no sons. In 1953, the Constitution of Denmark was amended to allow cognatic primogeniture. The new law made thirteen-year-old Princess Margrethe the new heir presumptive, placing her and her two sisters before Knud and his family in the line of succession to the Danish throne. Christian was thus relegated in line behind Margrethe, who was likely to have children of her own (as indeed happened). The princess became Queen Margrethe II in 1972 and reigned until her abdication in 2024.

== Marriage, loss of dynastic rights and children ==
By 1971, Princess Margrethe had produced two children, pushing Christian to 8th in the line of succession. He then chose to forfeit his right of succession to the throne by marrying without having received the royal assent of the monarch in the Council of State. His brother Ingolf had done the same three years previously.

The king's permission to marry was not sought because it was expected to be denied, since Christian's fiancée was an untitled commoner.

Prior to his elder son's wedding in 1968, Prince Knud sought to convince his brother that Ingolf should be allowed to retain his royal title after his non-dynastic marriage, a privilege which might have been subsequently extended to Christian. But the king refused, on the grounds that other males of the dynasty, who had been demoted to counts of Rosenborg upon marriage, might try to re-claim their royal rank if Ingolf were allowed to do so despite his marrying a commoner as they had done. So, in 1971, Christian renounced his rights to the throne and took the title count of Rosenborg.

On 27 February 1971, at Kongens Lyngby Kirke, Kongens Lyngby, Denmark, Christian married Anne Dorte Maltoft-Nielsen (3 October 1947 in Frederikssund – 2 January 2014 in Copenhagen) who thus became Her Excellency Countess Anne Dorte of Rosenborg. Although lacking the prior royal assent of the monarch given in the Council of State that the law required, the king expressed no personal opposition to his nephew's choice of bride and, according to Christian, the king's private consent later had to be formally registered by the King-in-Council. In a 1985 interview with Billed-Bladet, Count Christian had explained (translated from Danish):

As protocol dictates, I had to ask my uncle, King Frederik IX, if he had any objections to my getting engaged...I knew I would have to renounce my title of prince and my right of succession if I married her. I was number four in the line of succession after Princess Margrethe, Princess Benedikte, and my father. My brother, Ingolf, had two years previously lost his princely title and succession right when he married a commoner, Countess Inge. Now I was ready to follow him. To me, it didn't matter if I were in line for the throne or not...My uncle, of course, had nothing against a union between Anne Dorte and me.

Count Christian and Countess Anne Dorte had three daughters:

- Countess Josephine Caroline Elisabeth of Rosenborg (b. Frederikssund, 29 October 1972), married firstly in Lyngby on 3 October 1998 Thomas Christian Schmidt (b. Copenhagen, 22 April 1970), and had two children, married secondly on 6 August 2019 Kenneth Schmidt, without issue.
- Countess Camilla Alexandrine Cristine of Rosenborg (b. Frederikssund, 29 October 1972), married firstly in Søllerød Kirke, Søllerød, on 18 May 1995 Mikael Rosanes (b. 8 February 1952), and had four children, married secondly on 25 Aug 2018 Ivan Ottesen, without issue.
- Countess Feodora Mathilde Helena of Rosenborg (b. Frederikssund, 27 February 1975), married firstly at Holmens Kirke, in Copenhagen, on 31 July 2004 and divorced in 2006 Eric Hervé Patrice Patte (b. Pont-à-Mousson, 20 Aug 1976), without issue, married secondly in Copenhagen on 8 September 2008 Morten Rønnow (b. Tärnby, 18 June 1968), with issue.

All three were born “Komtesse[r]” a lower title than “Grevinde” which translates to “Countess” from birth. And a title that all daughters of Counts in Denmark are given.

== Public life ==
Count Christian took part in some major public events associated with the royal family, in 2004, he and Countess Anne Dorte attended the wedding on 14 May 2004 of Crown Prince Frederik at Copenhagen Cathedral, Copenhagen and the subsequent reception at Fredensborg Palace. They also attended the Memorial Service in honour of Empress Maria Feodorovna of Russia held on 22 September 2006. They were included in the official guest-list as members of the Danish Royal Family when they attended the luncheon to celebrate the 75th birthday of Prince Henrik at Fredensborg Palace on 11 June 2009; and the ruby jubilee celebrations for Queen Margrethe.

== Death ==
Count Christian died on 21 May 2013 (aged 70) at Gentofte Hospital, Copenhagen in Denmark. A number of members of the Danish royal family, led by Queen Margrethe, attended Count Christian's funeral, held at Lyngby Church on 29 May 2013. His wife Countess Anne Dorte of Rosenborg died just 7 months later on 2 January 2014 in Copenhagen.

== Ancestry ==
Ancestors of Count Christian of Rosenborg

8. Frederik VIII of Denmark
4. Christian X of Denmark
9. Princess Louise of Sweden
2. Knud, Hereditary Prince of Denmark
10. Frederick Francis III, Grand Duke of Mecklenburg-Schwerin
5. Duchess Alexandrine of Mecklenburg-Schwerin
11. Grand Duchess Anastasia Mikhailovna of Russia
1. Count Christian of Rosenborg
12. Frederik VIII of Denmark (= 8)
6. Prince Harald of Denmark
13. Princess Louise of Sweden (= 9)
3. Princess Caroline-Mathilde of Denmark
14. Friedrich Ferdinand, Duke of Schleswig-Holstein
7. Princess Helena of Schleswig-Holstein-Sonderburg-Glücksburg
15. Princess Karoline Mathilde of Schleswig-Holstein-Sonderburg-Augustenburg
