= Monarchy of Denmark =

King of Denmark
- Danmarks Konge
- Royal coat of arms of Denmark

Incumbent
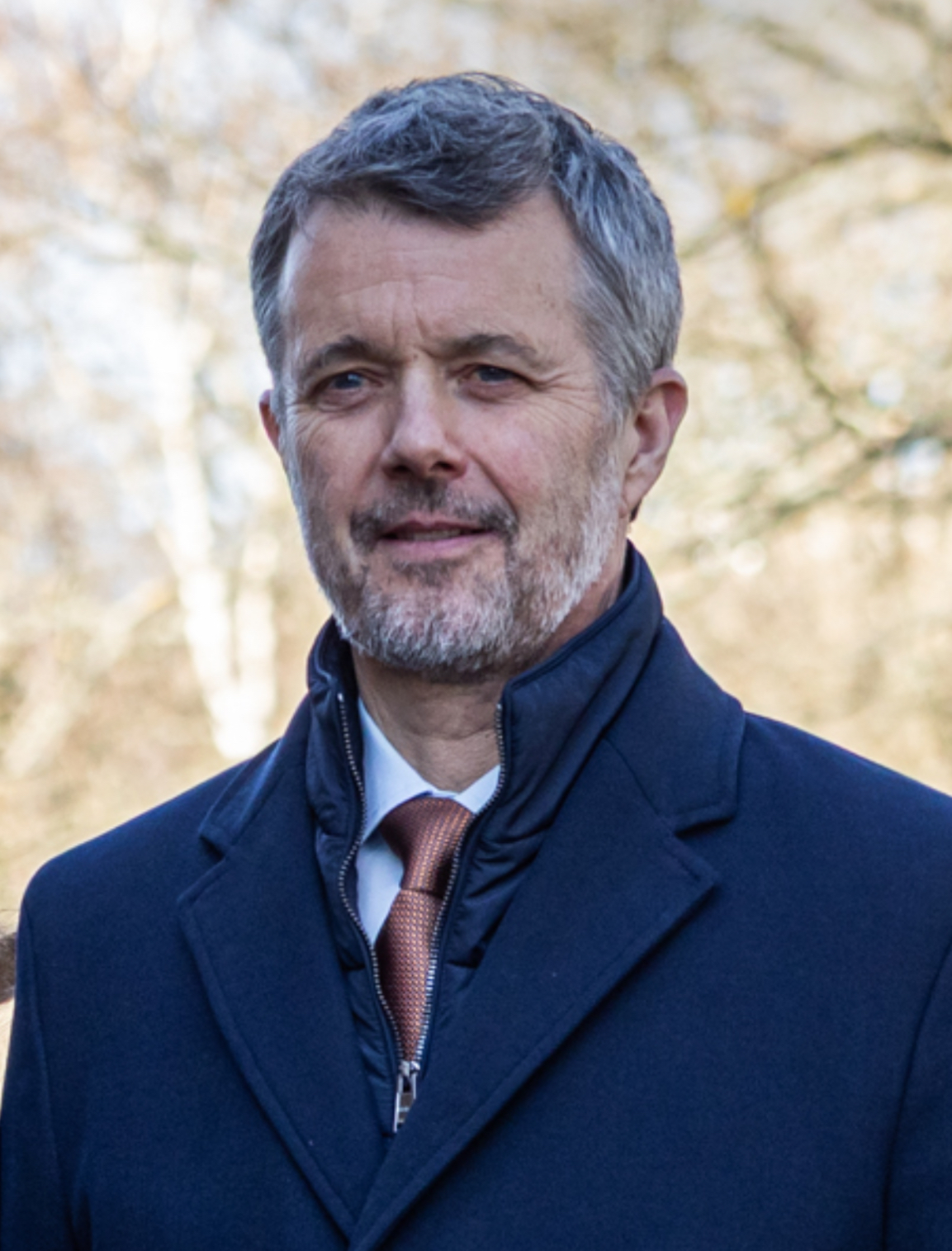
- Frederik X since 14 January 2024

Details
- Style: His Majesty
- Heir apparent: Christian, Crown Prince of Denmark
- First monarch: Ongendus (first king known by name)
- Formed: 710; 1316 years ago
- Residences: Amalienborg Palace; See list
- Website: www.kongehuset.dk/en

The monarchy of Denmark is a constitutional institution of the Danish Realm, which comprises Denmark proper and the autonomous overseas territories of the Faroe Islands and Greenland, being the system by which a hereditary monarch reigns as the realm's head of state. The current monarch is King Frederik X, who ascended the throne following the abdication of his mother, Queen Margrethe II, on 14 January 2024.

A Danish monarchy was already consolidated in the 8th century, whose rulers are consistently referred to in Frankish sources (and in some late Frisian sources) as "kings" (reges). Under the rule of King Gudfred in 804 it may have included all the major provinces of medieval Denmark. The current Danish realm was founded or re-united by the Viking kings Gorm the Old and Harald Bluetooth in the 10th century. Originally an elective monarchy, it became hereditary only in the 17th century during the reign of Frederick III. A decisive transition to a constitutional monarchy occurred in 1849 with the writing of the first democratic constitution, replacing the vast majority of the old absolutist constitution.

The current royal house is a branch of the ducal House of Glücksburg, originally from Schleswig-Holstein in modern-day Germany, the House of Glücksburg itself being a collateral branch of the House of Oldenburg; since 2024, the monarch is also an agnatic descendant of the French de Laborde de Monpezat family. The House of Glücksburg has also produced monarchs of Norway, of the United Kingdom and of the former Kingdom of Greece in the direct male line. Danish regnal names have traditionally (since 1513) alternated between "Frederik" (anglicised to Frederick) and "Christian". Accordingly, Frederik's heir apparent is Crown Prince Christian.

The Danish monarchy is constitutional and as such, the role of the monarch is defined and limited by the Constitution of Denmark. According to the constitution, the ultimate executive authority over the government of Denmark is still by and through the monarch's royal reserve powers; in practice these powers are only used according to laws enacted in Parliament or within the constraints of convention. The monarch is, in practice, limited to non-partisan functions such as bestowing honours and formally appointing the prime minister. The monarch and their immediate family undertake various official, ceremonial, diplomatic and representational duties.

== History ==
=== Early kingdom ===
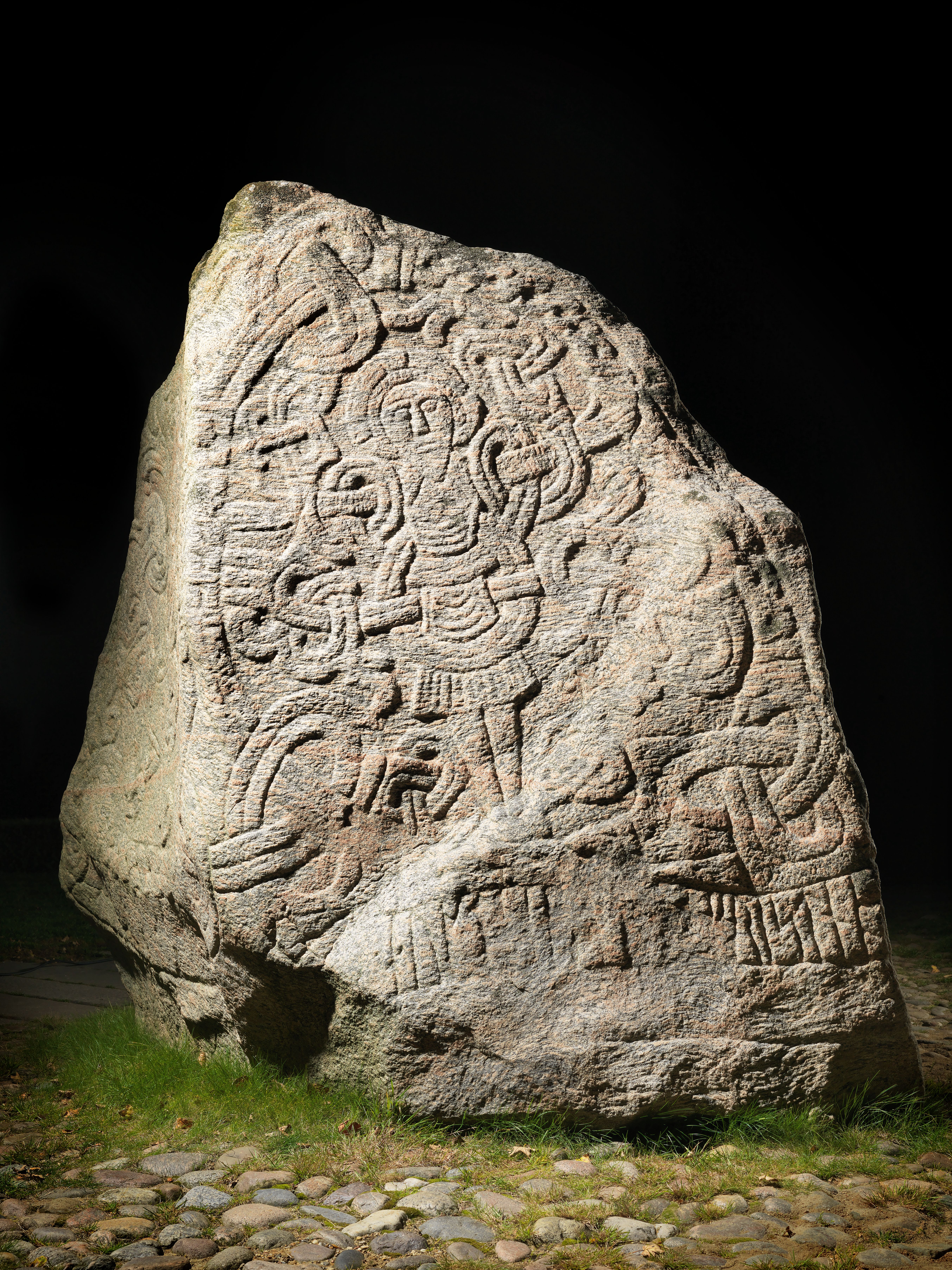
One of the two Jelling stones, attesting to Harald Bluetooth's unification and Christianization of Denmark

The Danish monarchy is over 1200 years old, founded in the 8th century (or earlier). The line of kings of the modern kingdom of Denmark can be traced back to Harthacnut, father of Gorm the Old (Old Norse: Gormr gamli, Danish: Gorm den gamle), who reigned in the early and mid 10th century. The kingdom itself though is probably a couple of hundred years older than that.

The Danes were united (or more likely reunited) and officially Christianized in 965 AD by Harald Bluetooth, the story of which is recorded on the Jelling stones. The exact extent of Harald's kingdom is unknown, although it is reasonable to believe that it stretched from the defensive line of Dannevirke, including the Viking city of Hedeby, across Jutland, the Danish isles and into southern present day Sweden; Scania and perhaps Halland. Furthermore, the Jelling stones attests that Harald had also "won" Norway. The son of Harald, Sweyn Forkbeard, mounted a series of wars of conquest against England, which was completed by Sweyn's son Cnut the Great by the middle of the eleventh century. The reign of Cnut represented the peak of the Danish Viking age; his North Sea Empire included England (1016), Denmark (1018), Norway (1028) and held strong influence over the north-eastern coast of Germany.

The last monarch descended from Valdemar IV, Christopher III of Denmark, died in 1448 AD. Count Christian of Oldenburg, descendant of Sophia, the daughter of Valdemar IV's aunt Richeza of Denmark, Lady of Werle, who was the daughter of Eric V of Denmark, was chosen as his successor and became the next monarch of Denmark, ruling under the name Christian I. Richeza thus can be considered as a sort of female founder of the House of Oldenburg.

=== Absolutism ===
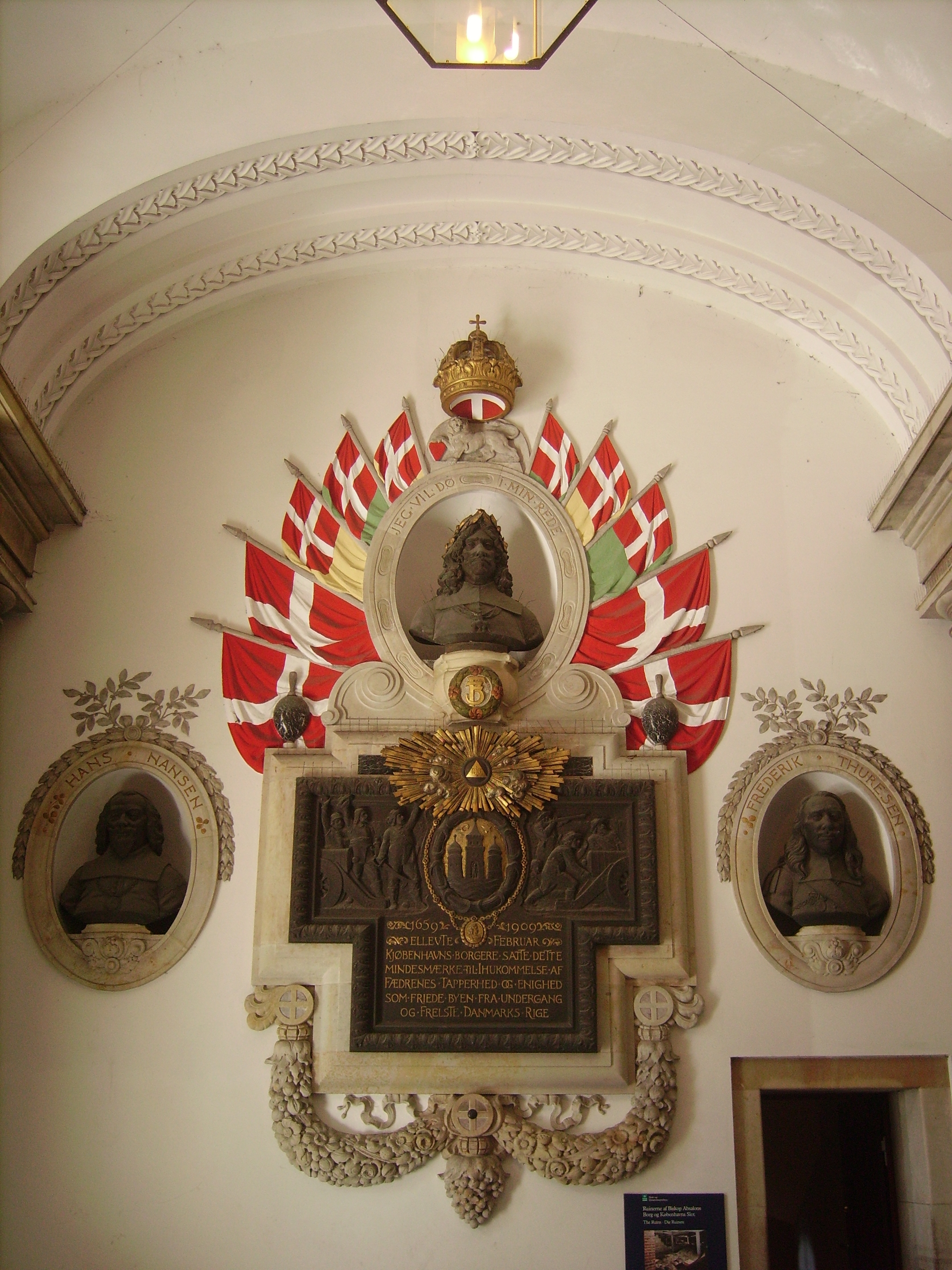
Memorial inside Christiansborg Palace. Depicted is Frederick III and the event commemorated is the failed Swedish attack on Copenhagen in 1659.

Originally the Danish monarchy was elective, but in practice the eldest son of the reigning monarch was elected. Later a Coronation Charter was signed by the king to restrict the powers of the Danish monarch.

In 1657, during the Second Northern War, King Frederick III launched a war of revenge against Sweden which turned into a complete disaster. The war became a disaster for two reasons: Primarily, because Denmark's new powerful ally, the Netherlands, remained neutral as Denmark was the aggressor and Sweden the defender. Secondly, the Belts froze over in a rare occurrence during the winter of 1657–1658, allowing King Charles X Gustav of Sweden to lead his armies across the ice to invade Zealand. In the following Treaty of Roskilde, Denmark–Norway capitulated and gave up all of Eastern Denmark (i.e. Skåne, Halland, Blekinge and Bornholm), in addition to the counties of Bohuslän and Trøndelag in Norway.

But the Second Northern War was not yet over. Three months after the peace treaty was signed, Charles X Gustav held a council of war where he decided to simply wipe Denmark from the map and unite all of Scandinavia under his rule. Once again the Swedish army arrived outside Copenhagen. However, this time the Danes did not panic or surrender. Instead, they decided to fight and prepared to defend Copenhagen. Frederick III had stayed in his capital and now encouraged the citizens of Copenhagen to resist the Swedes, by saying he would "die in his nest", rather than to evacuate to safety in Norway. Furthermore, this unprovoked declaration of war by Sweden finally triggered the alliance that Denmark–Norway had with the Netherlands, and a powerful Dutch fleet was sent to Copenhagen with vital supplies and reinforcements, which saved the city from being captured during the Swedish attack.

Charles X Gustav suddenly died of an illness in early 1660, while planning an invasion of Norway. Following his death, Sweden made peace in the Treaty of Copenhagen. The Swedes returned Trøndelag to Norway and Bornholm to Denmark, but kept the other territories gained two years earlier. The Netherlands and other European powers accepted the settlement, not wanting both coasts of the Øresund strait controlled by Denmark. This treaty established the boundaries between Norway, Denmark, and Sweden that still exist today. Absolutism was introduced in 1660–1661 and the elective monarchy was de jure transformed into an hereditary monarchy. An official absolutist constitution, where absolute power and male primogeniture succession was laid down in the King's Law (Lex Regia) of 1665.

=== Constitutional period ===
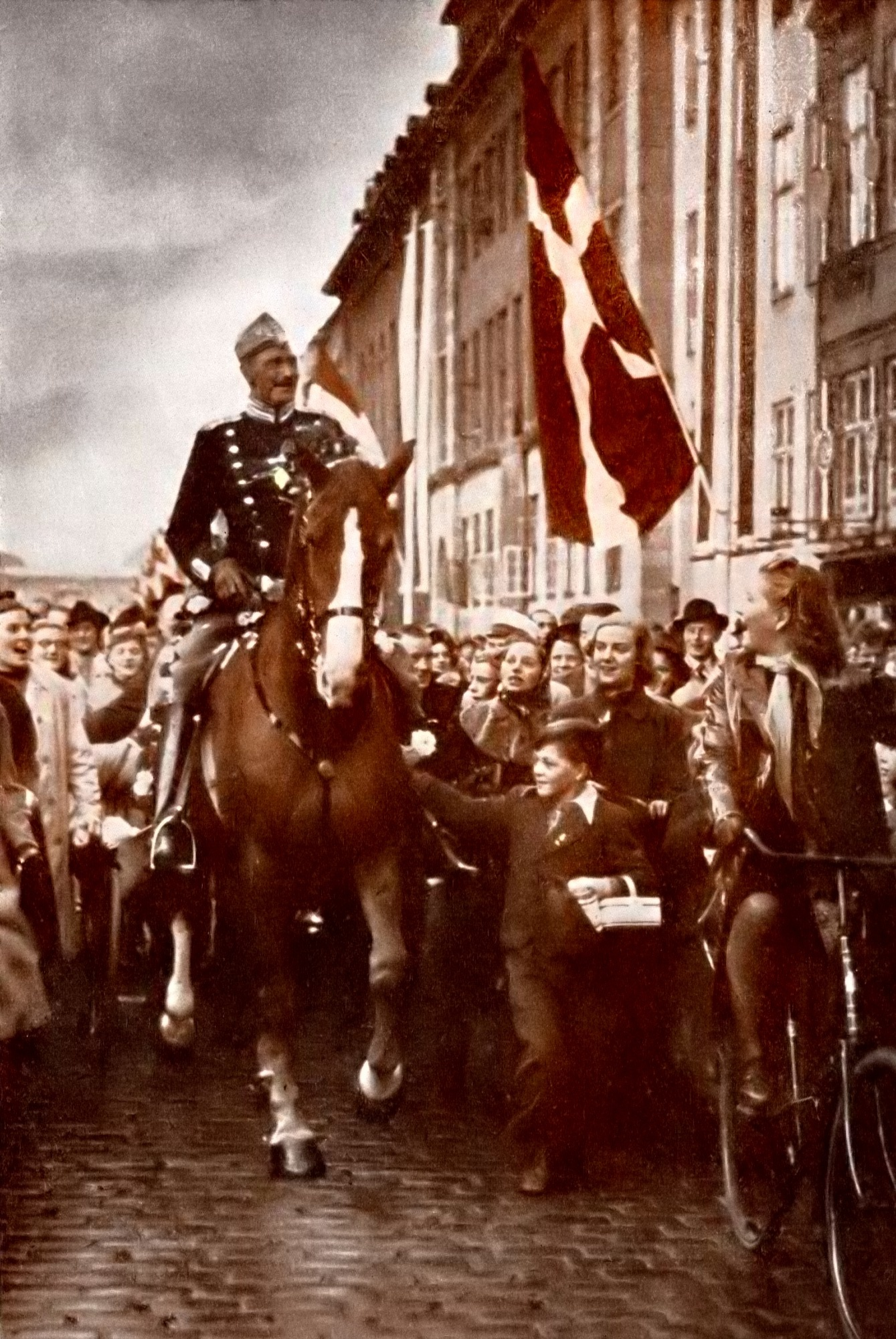
During the German occupation of World War II, King Christian X became a powerful symbol of national identity. This image dates from the King's birthday, 26 September 1940

When he succeeded to the throne in January 1848, King Frederick VII was almost at once met by the demands for a constitution and an end to absolutism. The Schleswig-Holsteiners wanted an independent state while the Danes wished to maintain South Jutland as a Danish area. Frederick VII soon yielded to the Danish demands, and in March he accepted the end of absolutism, which resulted in the June Constitution of 1849. During the First War of Schleswig against the German powers in 1848–51, Frederick appeared as "the national leader" and was regarded almost as a war hero, despite having never taken any active part in the struggles. On 5 June 1849 the constitution, known as the June Constitution, was altered to create the framework of a constitutional monarchy for Denmark. As King Frederick VII was without legitimate issue, Prince Christian of Glücksborg was chosen in 1853 as heir presumptive to the Danish throne, with the approval of the great powers of Europe, in light of the expected extinction of the senior line of the House of Oldenburg. A justification for this choice was his marriage to Louise of Hesse-Kassel, who as a niece of Christian VIII, was a more close relative to the incumbent king than her husband.

Upon the death of King Frederick VII of Denmark in 1863, Christian IX acceded to the throne as the first Danish monarch of the House of Glücksburg. Christian IX eventually became known as Father-in-law of Europe due to his family ties with most other ruling dynasties of Europe: His daughter Princess Alexandra married Edward VII of the United Kingdom, another daughter Princess Dagmar married Alexander III of Russia and Princess Thyra married Crown Prince Ernst August of Hanover. His son Vilhelm went on to become George I of Greece. Further, his grandson Carl became Haakon VII of Norway. To this day the Danish Royal Family are related to most other reigning European dynasties.

The Easter Crisis of 1920 was a constitutional crisis which began with the dismissal of the elected government by King Christian X, a reserve power which was granted to him by the Danish constitution. The immediate cause was a conflict between the king and the cabinet over the reunification with Denmark of Schleswig, a former Danish fiefdom which had been lost to Prussia during the Second War of Schleswig. According to the terms of the Treaty of Versailles, the disposition of Schleswig was to be determined by two Schleswig Plebiscites: one in Northern Schleswig (today Denmark's South Jutland County), the other in Central Schleswig (today part of the German state of Schleswig-Holstein). Many Danish nationalists felt that Central Schleswig should be returned to Denmark regardless of the plebiscite's results, generally motivated by a desire to see Germany permanently weakened in the future. Christian X agreed with these sentiments, and ordered Prime Minister Carl Theodor Zahle to include Central Schleswig in the re-unification process. As Denmark had been operating as a parliamentary democracy since the Cabinet of Deuntzer in 1901, Zahle felt he was under no obligation to comply. He refused the order and resigned several days later after a heated exchange with the king.

Subsequently, Christian X dismissed the rest of the government and replaced it with a de facto conservative care-taker cabinet under Otto Liebe. The dismissal caused demonstrations and an almost revolutionary atmosphere in Denmark, and for several days the future of the monarchy seemed very much in doubt. In light of this, negotiations were opened between the king and members of the Social Democrats. Faced with the potential overthrow of the Danish monarchy, Christian X backed down and dismissed his own government. This was the most recent time that a sitting Danish monarch made an executive decision without the support of a cabinet accountable to the legislature; following the crisis, Christian X accepted his drastically reduced role as symbolic head of state.

The Act of Succession of 27 March 1953 was promulgated after a 1953 referendum introduced the possibility of female succession and, in effect, made Princess Margrethe the heir presumptive to her father, Frederik IX rather than her uncle Prince Knud. Upon Frederik IX's death in 1972, Queen Margrethe II ascended to the throne and reigned until her abdication in 2024.

Following a referendum in 2009, the Act of Succession was amended so that primogeniture no longer puts males over females; a first-born child becomes heir to the throne regardless of gender.

== Constitutional and official role ==
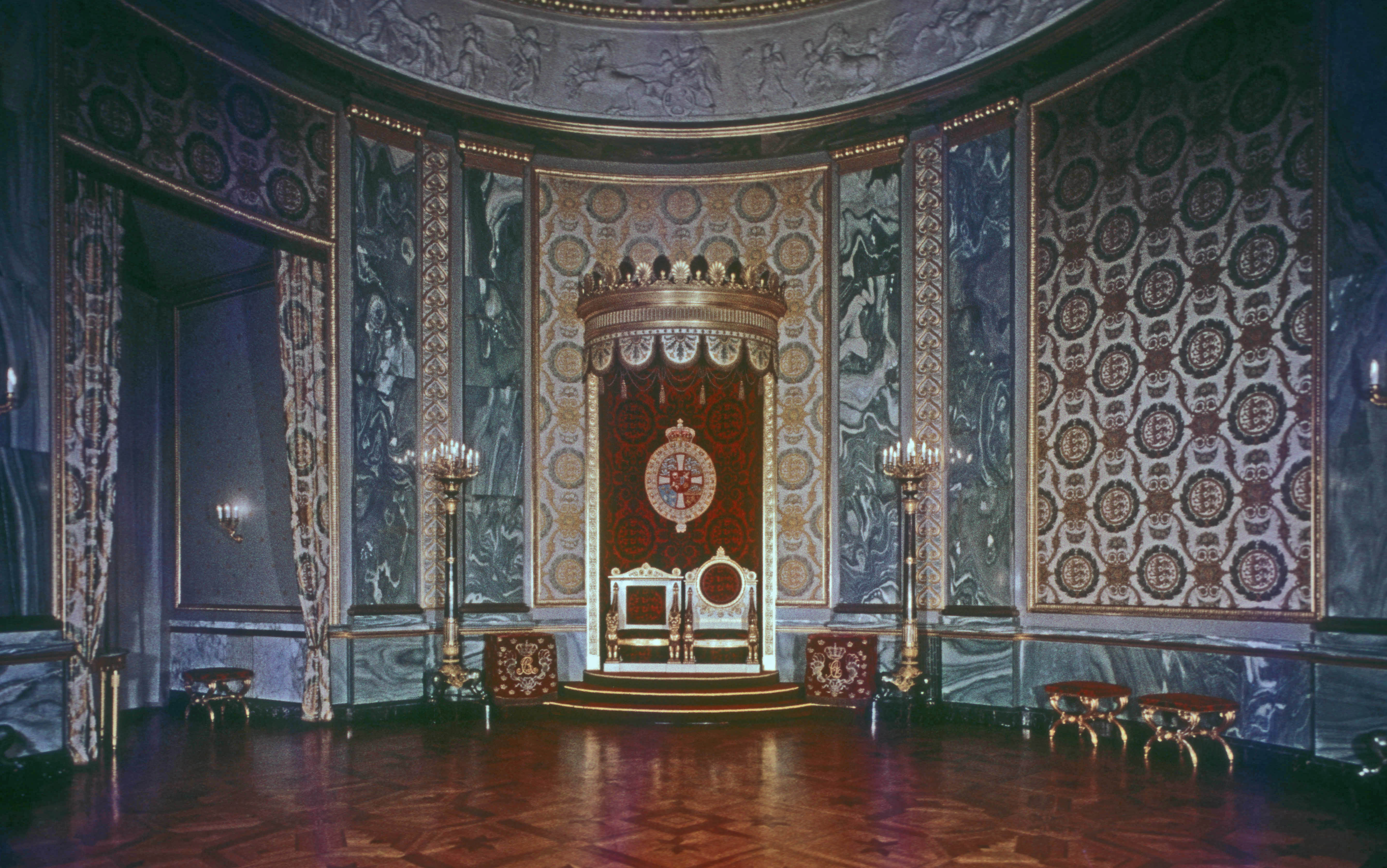
The Throne Room at Christiansborg Palace is where foreign ambassadors present their credentials to the King

According to the Danish Constitution, the Danish monarch, is the head of state and implicitly the commander-in-chief of the Danish Armed Forces and is the holder of executive power and, jointly with the Folketing, legislative power. The monarch has the ability to deny giving a bill royal assent as well as to choose and dismiss the Prime Minister or any Minister of Government with or without cause; however, no monarch has exercised the latter powers since King Christian X dismissed the government on 28 March 1920, sparking the 1920 Easter Crisis. The Monarch along with the Folketing is the Head of the Church of Denmark as well as being the head of the Danish Honors system, the sovereign and royal family are also exempt from paying taxes and given immunity from all criminal prosecution. The Danish monarch is also one of the few monarchs in the world who still enjoys Lèse-majesté protections, though not regularly enforced they are occasionally enacted depending on the circumstance.

However, when reading the Danish Constitution of 1953, it is important to bear in mind that the usage of the word king, in the context of exercising acts of state, is understood by Danish jurists to be read as the Government (consisting of the Prime Minister and other ministers). This is a logical consequence of articles 12, 13 and 14, all of which in essence stipulate that the powers vested in the monarch can only be exercised through ministers, who are responsible for all acts, thus removing any political or legal liability from the monarch.

Today the monarch delegates much royal authority to Ministers in government, allowing the king to engage in the ceremonial role outlined by the Danish constitution. The Prime Minister and Cabinet attend the regular meetings of the Council of State, at which the monarch presides and gives royal assent to laws. The Prime Minister and the Minister of Foreign Affairs report regularly to the monarch to advise him of the latest political developments. The monarch hosts official visits by foreign Heads of State, pays state visits abroad, receives letters of credence from foreign ambassadors and signs those of Danish ambassadors. The convention for appointment of a new prime minister after a general election is that after consultation with representatives of the political parties, the monarch invites the party leader who has the support of the largest number of seats in the Folketing to form a government. Once it has been formed, the monarch formally appoints it.

=== Greenland and the Faroe Islands ===
Greenland and the Faroe Islands are part of the Kingdom of Denmark and thus their head of state is also the monarch of Denmark, in accordance with the Danish Constitution.

After a referendum in Greenland in 2009, the Danish Parliament adopted the Act on Greenlandic Self-Rule, which acknowledges Greenlanders as a people in accordance with international law, thereby recognizing the right of Greenlanders to self-determination.

== Succession ==
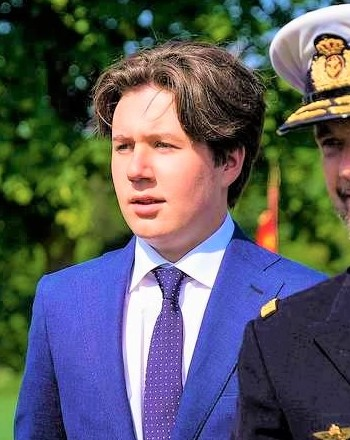
Christian, Crown Prince of Denmark has been the heir apparent since 2024

Denmark has had absolute primogeniture since 2009. The Danish Act of Succession adopted on 27 March 1953 restricts the throne to those descended from King Christian X and his wife, Alexandrine of Mecklenburg-Schwerin, through approved marriages.

Dynasts lose their right to the throne if they marry without the permission of the monarch given in the Council of State. Individuals born to unmarried dynasts or to former dynasts who married without royal permission, and their descendants, are excluded from the throne. Further, when approving a marriage, the monarch can impose conditions that must be met in order for any resulting offspring to have succession rights. Part II, Section 9 of the Danish Constitution of 5 June 1953 provides that the parliament will elect a king and determine a new line of succession should a situation arise where there are no eligible descendants of King Christian X and Queen Alexandrine.

The monarch of Denmark must be a member of the Danish National Church, or Evangelical Lutheran Church of Denmark (Danish Constitution, II,6). The National Church is by law the State Church. Although the monarch is not the head of the Church, the monarch, together with the Folketing, makes up the secular supreme authority of the Church. In that role, the monarch is requested to fulfil certain duties pertaining to the Church, such as appointing new bishops and authorising texts for use in the Church.

Christian, Crown Prince of Denmark has been the heir apparent to the Danish throne since 14 January 2024, following the abdication of his grandmother, Margrethe II, and the ascension of his father, King Frederik X.

=== Background ===
The first law governing the succession to the Danish throne as a hereditary monarchy was the Kongeloven (Latin: Lex Regia), enacted 14 November 1665, and published in 1709. It declared that the crown of Denmark shall descend by heredity to the legitimate descendants of King Frederick III, and that the order of succession shall follow semi-Salic primogeniture, according to which the crown is inherited by an heir, with preference among the Monarch's children to males over females; among siblings to the elder over the younger; and among Frederick III's remoter descendants by substitution, senior branches over junior branches. Female descendants were eligible to inherit the throne in the event there were no eligible surviving male dynasts born in the male line. As for the duchies, Holstein and Lauenburg where the King ruled as duke, these lands adhered to Salic law (meaning that only males could inherit the ducal throne), and by mutual agreement were permanently conjoined. The duchies of Schleswig (a Danish fief), Holstein and Lauenburg (German fiefs) were joined in personal union with the Crown of Denmark.

This difference caused problems when Frederick VII of Denmark proved childless, making a change in dynasty imminent, and causing the lines of succession for the duchies on one hand and for Denmark on the other to diverge. That meant that the new King of Denmark would not also be the new Duke of Schleswig or Duke of Holstein. To ensure the continued adhesion of the Elbe duchies to the Danish Crown, the line of succession to the duchies was modified in the London Protocol of 1852, which designated Prince Christian IX of Schleswig-Holstein-Sonderburg-Glücksburg, as the new heir apparent, although he was, strictly, the heir neither to the Crown of Denmark nor to the Duchies of Schleswig, Holstein or Lauenburg by primogeniture. Originally, the Danish prime minister Christian Albrecht Bluhme wanted to keep the separate hereditary principles, but in the end the government decided on a uniform agnatic primogeniture, which was accepted by the Parliament.

This order of succession remained in effect for a hundred years, then the Salic law was changed to male-preference primogeniture in 1953, meaning that females could inherit, but only if they had no brothers. In 2009, the mode of inheritance of the throne was once more changed, this time into an absolute primogeniture.

=== Privileges and restrictions ===
Royal Standard of Denmark

Following the transformation of Denmark's monarchy from elective (at least theoretically, although it had generally descended to the eldest son of the House of Oldenburg since 1448) to hereditary in 1660, the so-called Kongelov (Latin: Lex Regia) established the right to rule "by the grace of God" for King Frederick III and his posterity. Out of the articles in this law, all except for Article 21 and Article 25 have since been repealed.

Article 21 states "No Prince of the Blood, who resides here in the Realm and in Our territory, shall marry, or leave the Country, or take service under foreign Masters, unless he receives Permission from the King". Under this provision, princes of Denmark who permanently reside in other realms by express permission of the Danish Crown (i.e. members of the dynasties of Greece, Norway and the United Kingdom) do not thereby forfeit their royalty in Denmark, nor are they bound to obtain prior permission to travel abroad or to marry from its sovereign, although since 1950 those not descended in male-line from King Christian IX are no longer in the line of succession to the Danish throne. However, those who do reside in Denmark or its territories continue to require the monarch's prior permission to travel abroad and to marry.

Article 25 of the Kongelov stipulates, with respect to members of the Royal dynasty: "They should answer to no Magistrate Judges, but their first and last Judge shall be the King, or to whomsoever He decrees." Although all other articles of the Kongelov have been repealed by amendments to the Constitution in 1849, 1853 and 1953, these two articles have thus far been left intact.

The Danish monarch holds the fount of honour to bestow new titles of nobility in Denmark.

== Residences ==
The royal palaces of Denmark became property of the state with the introduction of the constitutional monarchy in 1849. Since then, a varying number of these have been put at the disposal of the monarchy. The agreement on which is renewed at the accession of every new monarch.

=== Current residences ===
==== Amalienborg Palace ====
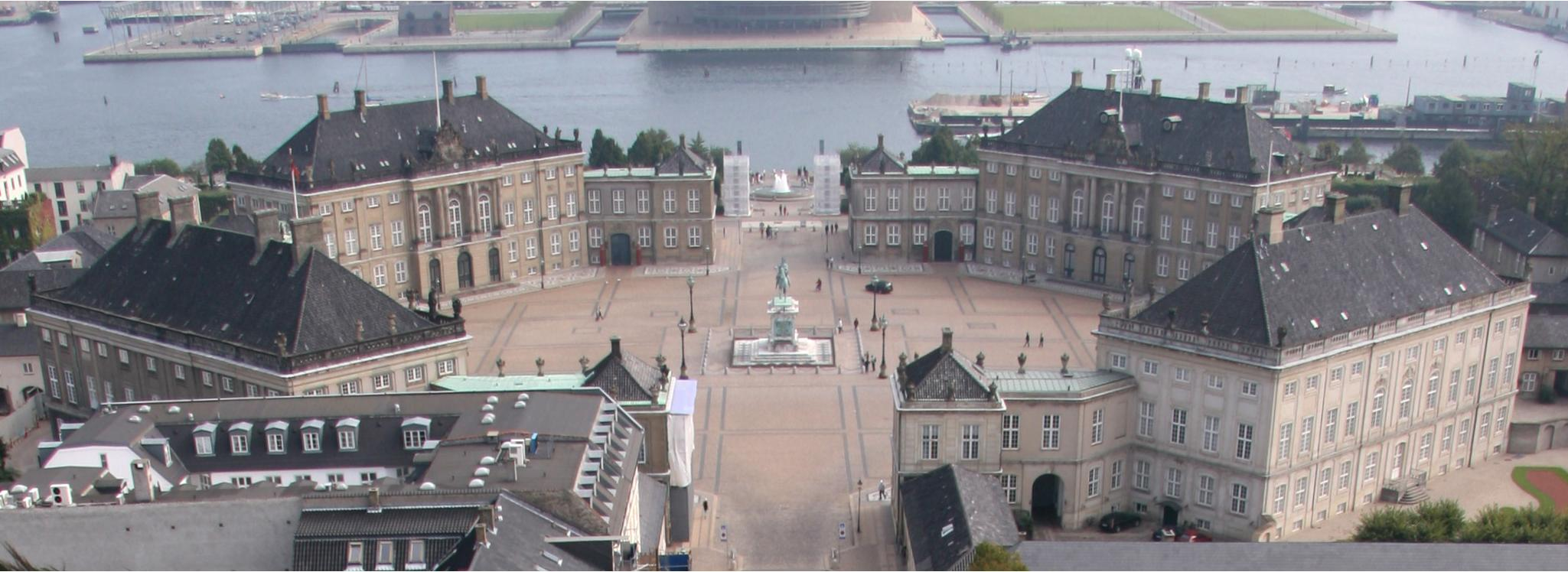
Amalienborg Palace, the monarch's principal residence.

The monarch has the use of the four palaces at Amalienborg in Copenhagen as a residence and work palace. These are arranged around an octagonal courtyard. Currently, Queen Margrethe resides in Christian IX's Palace and the King in Frederik VIII's Palace. Christian VIII's Palace has apartments for other members of the royal family, whereas Christian VII's Palace is used for official events and to accommodate guests.

Amalienborg was originally built in the 1750s by architect Nicolai Eigtved for four noble families; however, when Christiansborg Palace burned in 1794, the royal family bought the palaces and moved in.

The state rooms of Christian VIII's Palace and Christian VII's Palace may be visited by the public on guided tours.

==== Christiansborg Palace ====
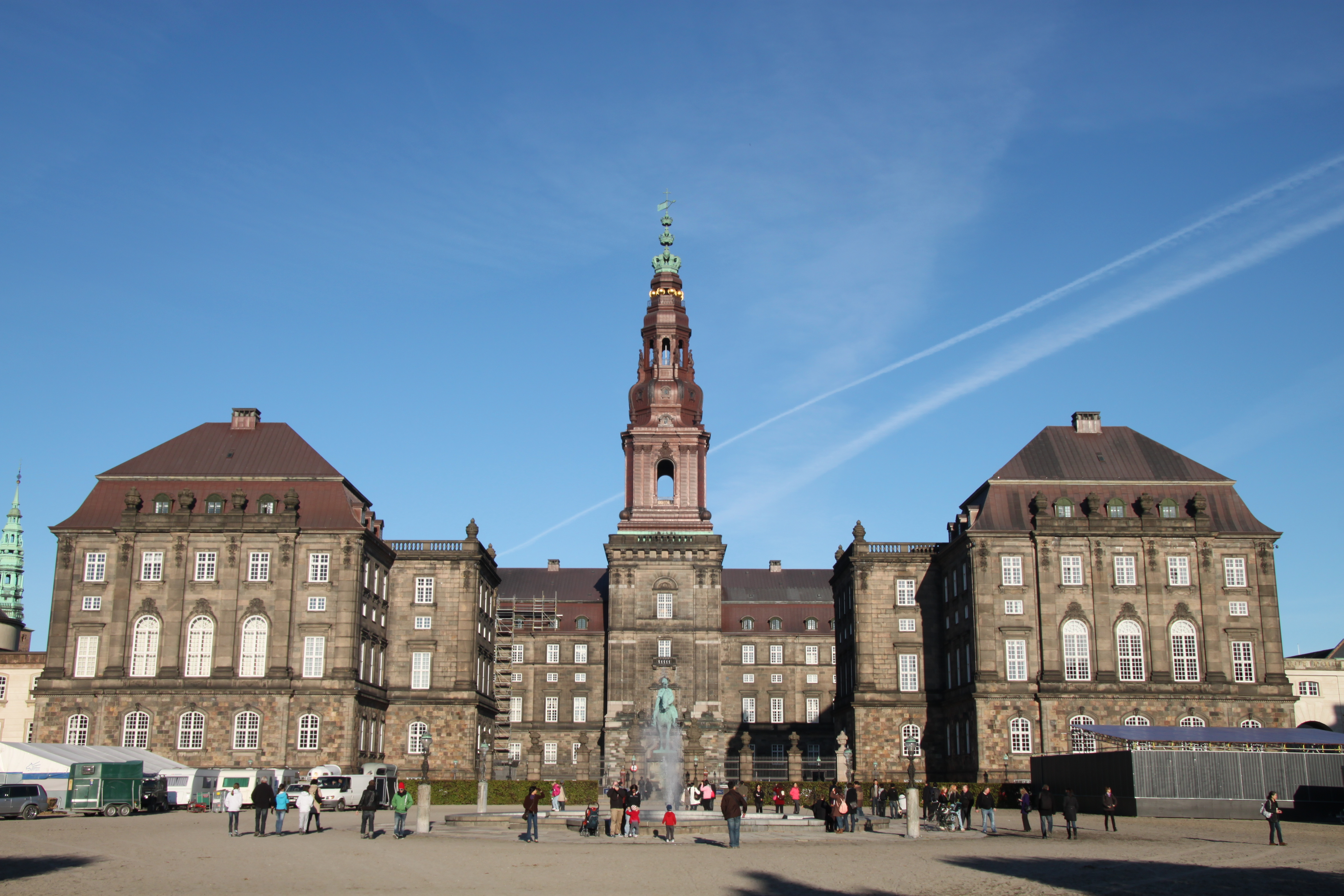
Christiansborg Palace

In addition, parts of Christiansborg Palace in Copenhagen are also at the disposal of the monarch. It is the site of official functions such as banquets, state dinners, diplomatic accreditations, public audiences, meetings of the Council of State, receptions, royal christenings, lyings-in-state and other ceremonies. Also, the Royal Stables which provide the ceremonial transport by horse-drawn carriage for the royal family, are located here.

The present building, the third with this name, is the last in a series of successive castles and palaces constructed on the same site since the erection of the first castle in 1167. The palace today bears witness to three eras of architecture, as the result of two serious fires in 1794 and in 1884. The main part of the current palace, finished in 1928, is in the historicist Neo-Baroque style. The chapel dates to 1826 and is in a Neoclassical style. The showgrounds were built 1738–46, in a Baroque style.

The royal parts of the palace are open to the public when not in use.

==== Fredensborg Palace ====
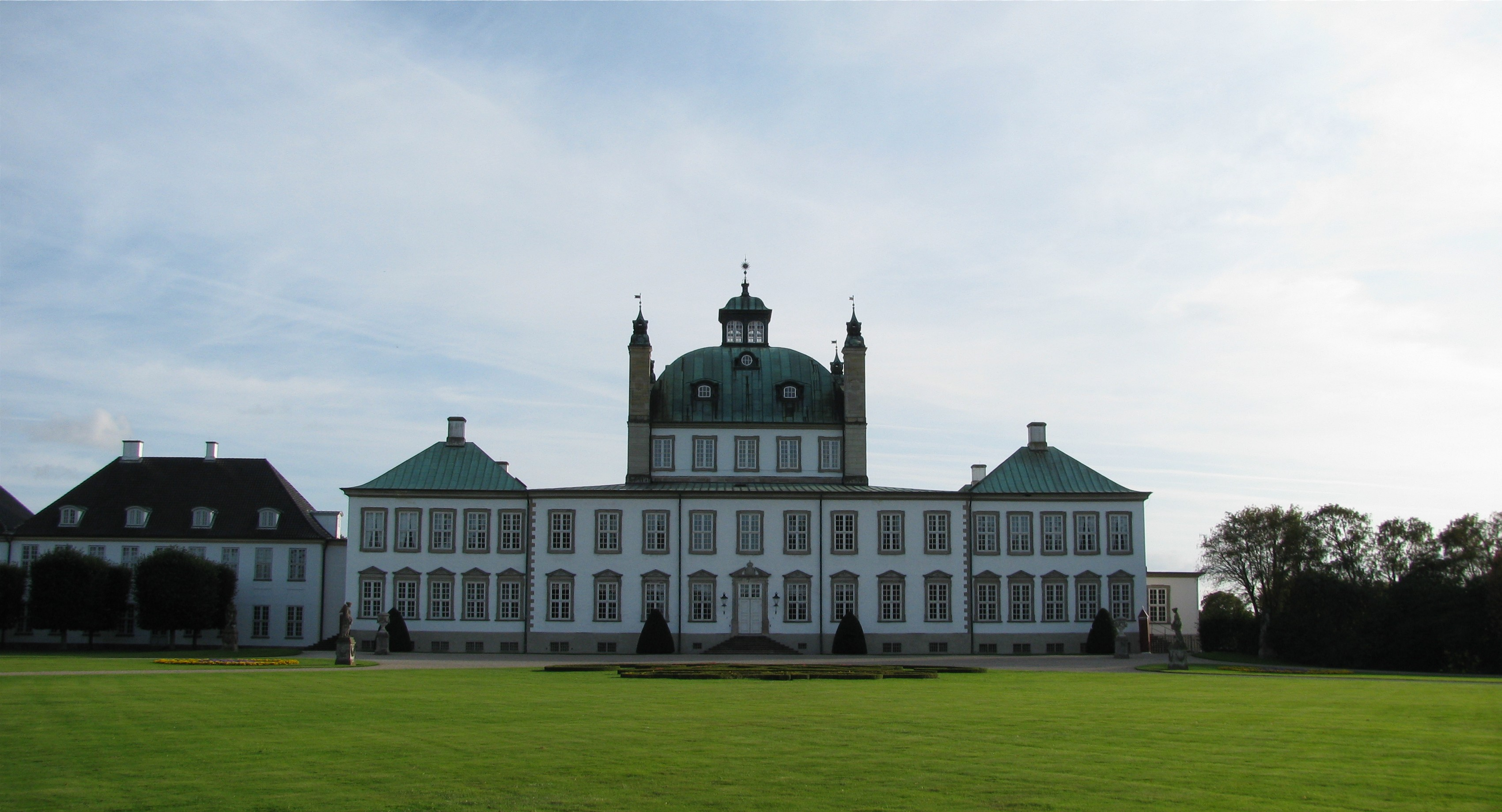
Fredensborg Palace

Another residence is Fredensborg Palace north of Copenhagen which is used principally in Spring and Autumn. It is often the site of state visits and ceremonial events in the royal family.

The palace may be visited by the public on guided tours when not in use.

==== Graasten Palace ====
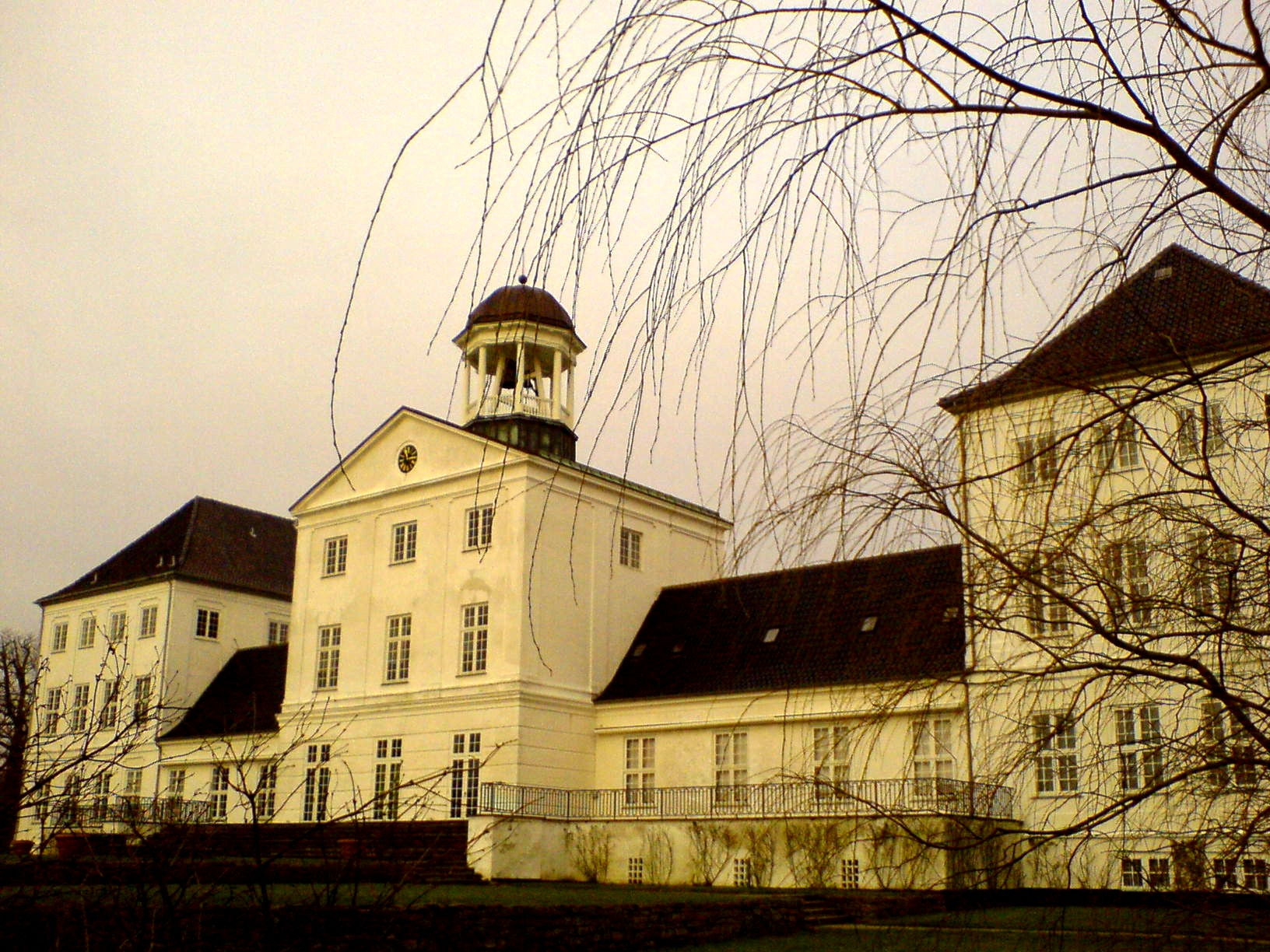
Gråsten Palace

In Jutland, Graasten Palace is at the disposal of the monarch. It was used as the summer residence of King Frederik IX and Queen Ingrid. Since the death of Queen Ingrid in 2000, the Queen has stayed at Graasten for a yearly vacation in summer.

==== Hermitage Hunting Lodge ====
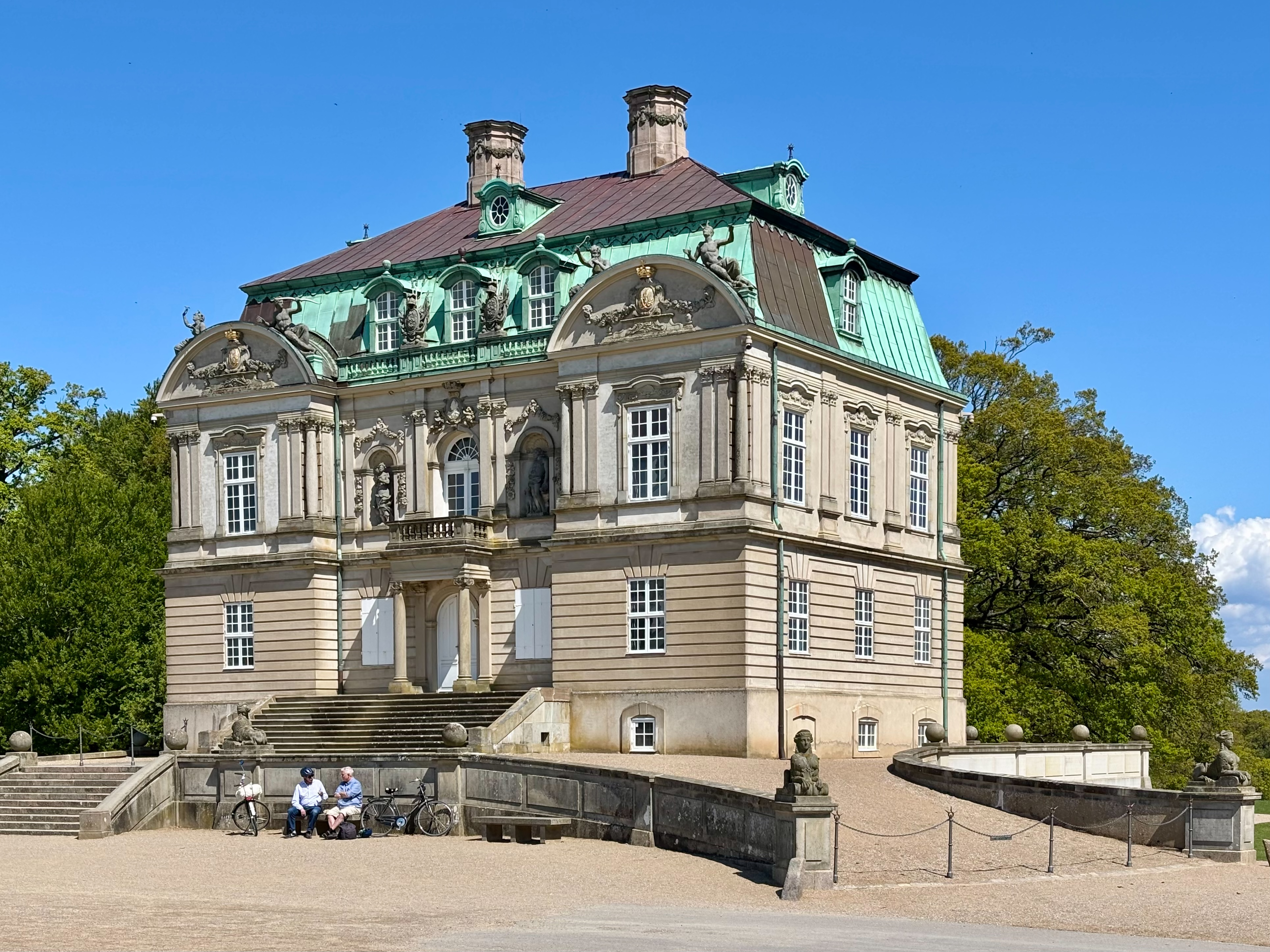
Hermitage Lodge

The hunting lodge the Eremitage Palace in the Dyrehaven deer park north of Copenhagen is used during royal hunts in Dyrehaven.

==== Sorgenfri Palace ====
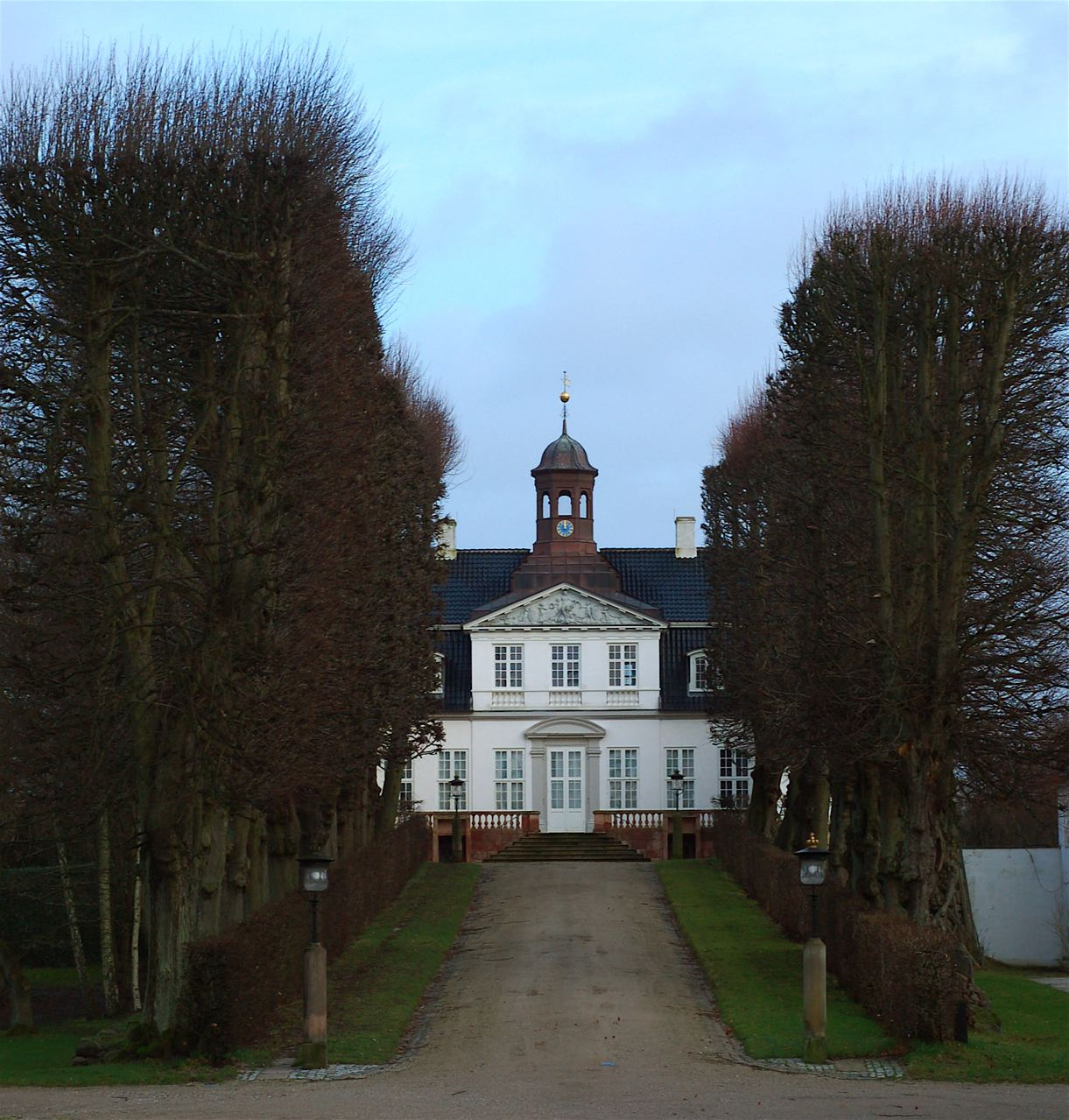
Sorgenfri Palace

Sorgenfri Palace is at the disposal of the monarch. It was the residence of Hereditary Prince Knud and Hereditary Princess Caroline Mathilde and is not in official use at all at this time.

==== Marselisborg Palace ====
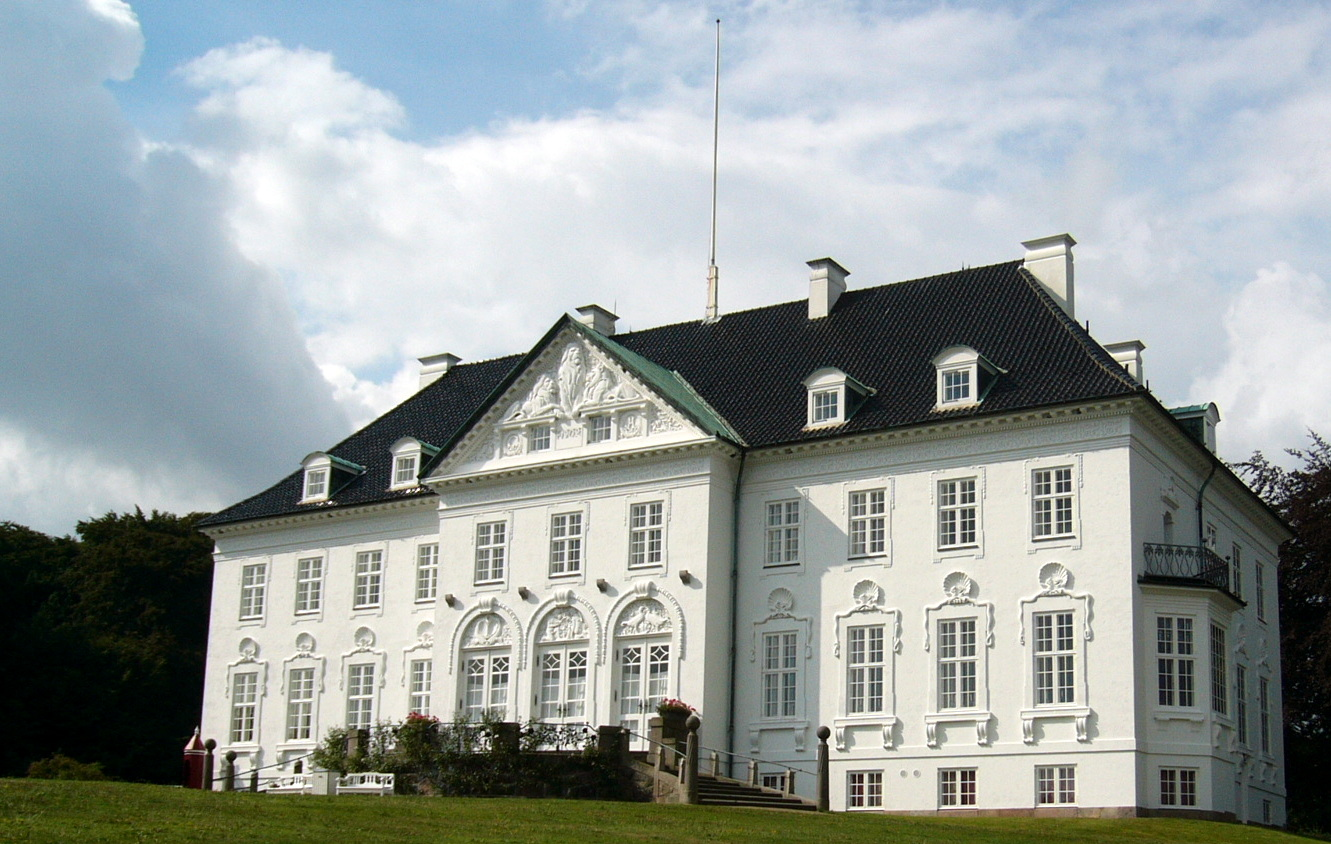
Marselisborg Palace

Apart from these state-owned palaces, Marselisborg Palace in Aarhus is privately owned by Queen Margrethe. It functions as the summer residence of Queen Margrethe, as well as during the Easter and Christmas holidays.

=== ===
Château de Cayx is a residence of the Danish royal family located in the wine district of Cahors in southern France.

The château was first fortified during the fourteenth century. Since then it has been rebuilt and renovated several times. The Lefrancs built the extensive wine cellars under the château.

The phylloxera infestation devastated the vineyards during the late nineteenth century, and the owners emigrated to Indo-China. They did not return to Europe until 1955. In 1967 the family's heir, Henri Marie Jean André de Laborde de Monpezat, married Princess Margrethe, then heiress presumptive to the Danish throne, becoming Prince Consort of Denmark after she succeeded to Denmark's throne.

The royal couple purchased the château and the estate in 1974. Since then they have renovated it extensively. According to the official website of the Danish monarchy, the residence has become a "relaxed setting for reunions of the entire Danish Royal Family and their French relatives". It has been the setting for holiday photocalls for the Danish royal family, including for Prince Henrik's 80th birthday.

The residence is not open to the public. A guided tour of the gardens is available during the summer. The château still produces wine.

== Royal Family ==
In the Kingdom of Denmark all members of the ruling dynasty who hold the title Prince or Princess of Denmark are said to be members of the Danish royal family. As with other European monarchies, distinguishing who is a member of the national royal family is difficult due to lack of strict legal or formal definition of who is or is not a member. The Queen and her siblings belong to the House of Glücksburg, a branch of the House of Oldenburg.

=== Main members ===
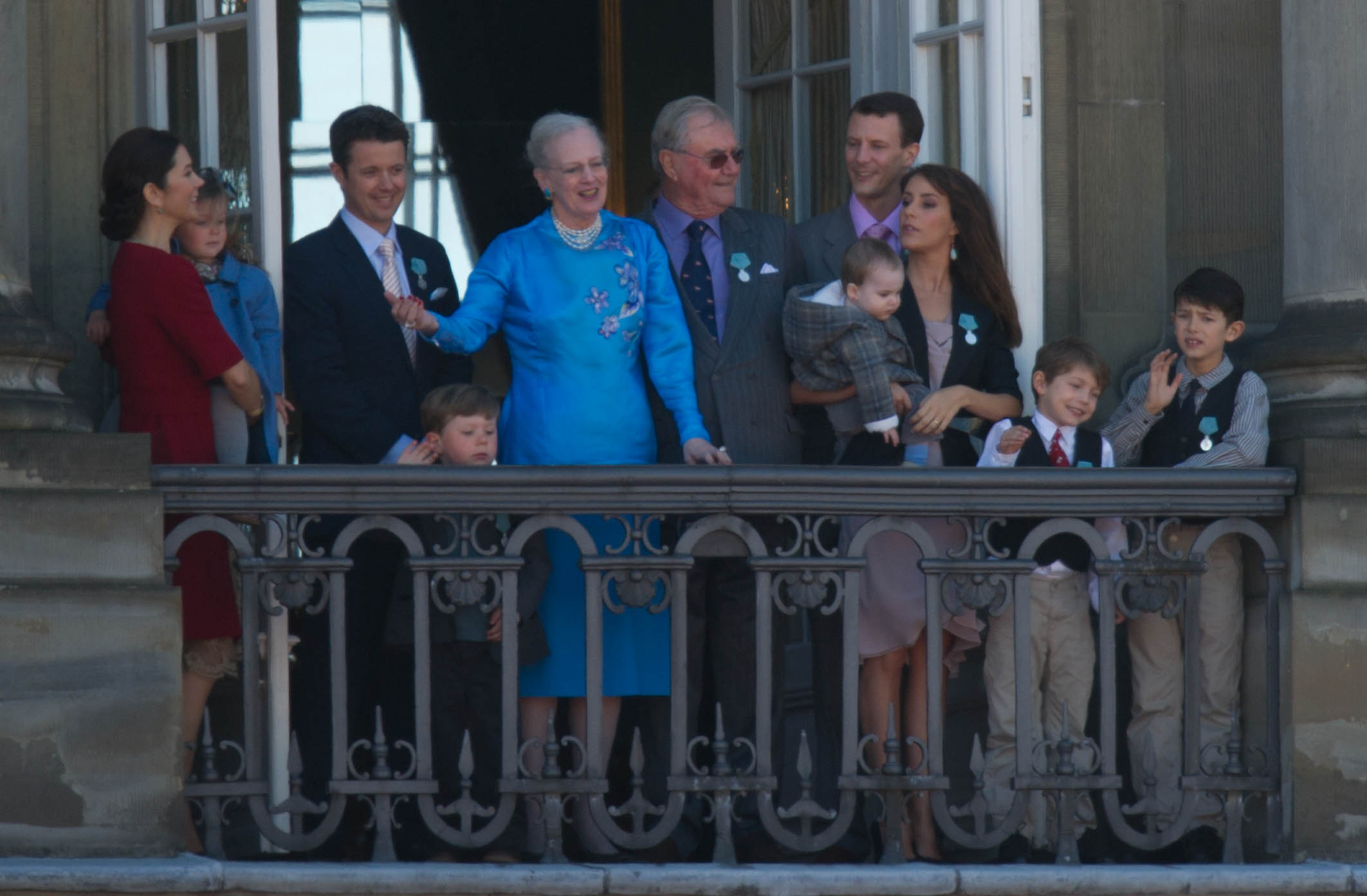
The Royal Family of Denmark during Queen Margrethe II's 70th birthday, 16 April 2010.

The Danish royal family includes:

- King Frederik X (The reigning Monarch)
  - Queen Mary of Denmark (The Monarch's spouse)
    - Crown Prince Christian (The Crown Prince)
    - Princess Isabella (The Monarch's elder daughter)
    - Prince Vincent (The Monarch's younger son)
    - Princess Josephine (The Monarch's younger daughter)
- Queen Margrethe II (The former reigning Monarch, The Monarch's mother)
  - Prince Joachim (The Monarch's younger brother)
  - Princess Marie (Prince Joachim's second wife)
    - Count Nikolai (Prince Joachim's eldest son)
    - Count Felix (Prince Joachim's second son)
    - Count Henrik (Prince Joachim's youngest son)
    - Countess Athena (Prince Joachim's daughter)
- The Dowager Princess of Sayn-Wittgenstein-Berleburg (Princess Benedikte, The King's aunt)
- The Dowager Queen of the Hellenes (Queen Anne-Marie, The King's aunt)

=== Extended members ===
The extended Danish royal family which includes people who do not hold the title of Prince or Princess of Denmark, but have close connections to Queen Margrethe and sometimes attend Danish royal family functions, could be said to include:

- The Prince of Sayn-Wittgenstein-Berleburg (Prince Gustav, Princess Benedikte's son)
- The Princess of Sayn-Wittgenstein-Berleburg (Princess Carina, Prince Gustav's wife)
  - Prince Gustav Albrecht of Sayn-Wittgenstein-Berleburg (Prince Gustav's son)
  - Princess Mafalda of Sayn-Wittgenstein-Berleburg (Prince Gustav's daughter)
- Princess Alexandra of Sayn-Wittgenstein-Berleburg (Princess Benedikte's eldest daughter)
- Count Michael Ahlefeldt-Laurvig-Bille (Princess Alexandra's husband)
  - Count Richard von Pfeil und Klein-Ellguth (Princess Alexandra's son)
  - Countess Ingrid von Pfeil und Klein-Ellguth (Princess Alexandra's daughter)
- Princess Nathalie of Sayn-Wittgenstein-Berleburg (Princess Benedikte's youngest daughter)
  - Konstantin Johannsmann (Princess Nathalie's son)
  - Louisa Johannsmann (Princess Nathalie's daughter)
- Count Ingolf of Rosenborg (cousin of Queen Margrethe)
- Countess Sussie of Rosenborg (Count Ingolf's wife)
- Alexandra, Countess of Frederiksborg (ex-wife of Prince Joachim, mother of Count Nikolai and Count Felix)

=== Greek royal family ===
Most members of the Greek royal family are members of the Danish royal family and bear the title of Prince or Princess of Greece and Denmark, as descendants of Christian IX of Denmark. Due to the morganatic status of her marriage, Marina, consort of Prince Michael, and their children, Princesses Alexandra and Olga, are exceptions.

== Style ==
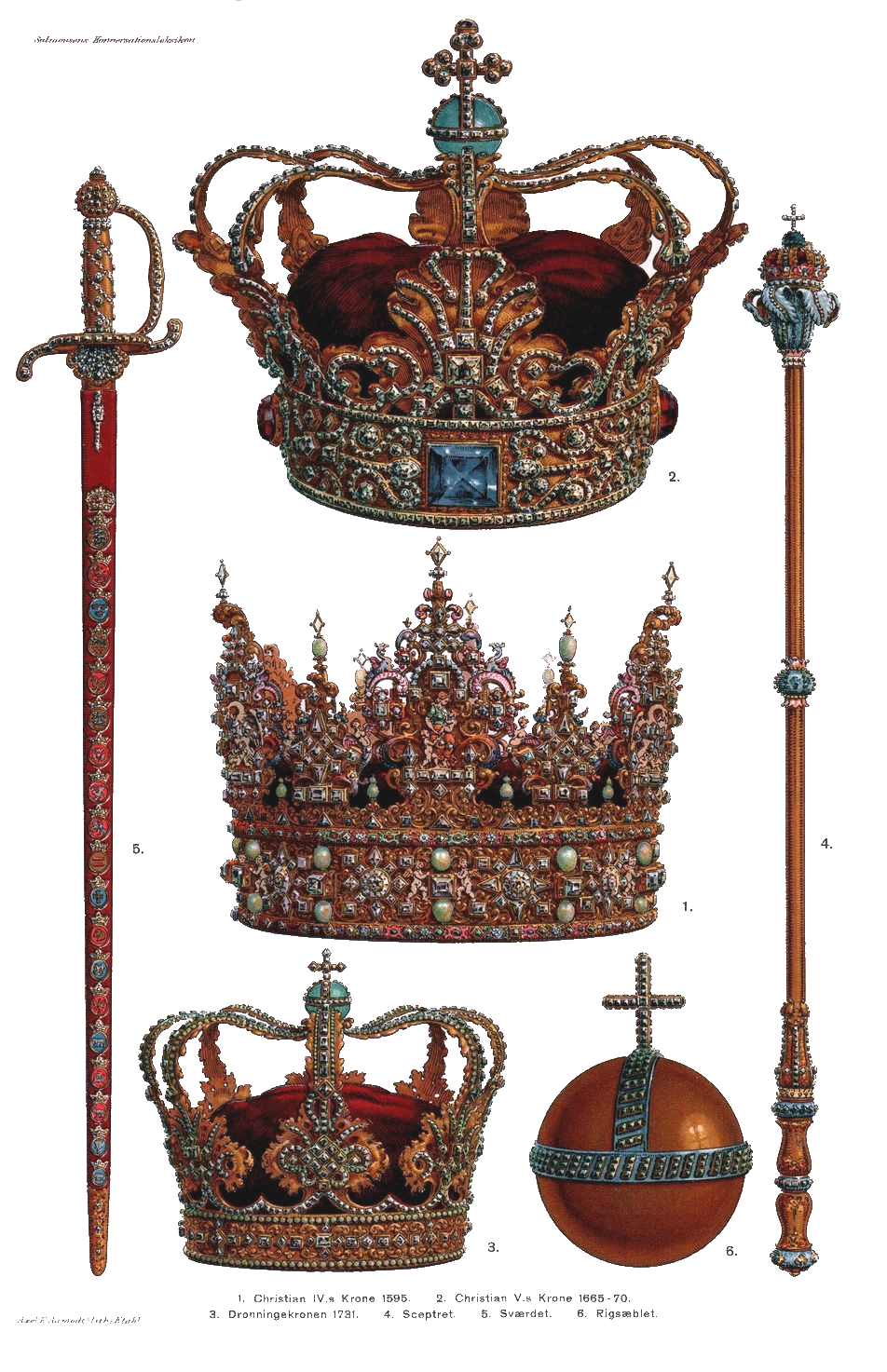
The Danish Crown Regalia, all of which are on public display at Rosenborg Castle in Copenhagen: 1. Crown of Christian IV (1595); 2. Crown of Christian V (1665–1670); 3. The Queen consort crown (1731); 4. Sceptre; 5. Sword of state; and, 6. Globus cruciger

The monarchs of Denmark have a long history of royal and noble titles, including the historical titles King of the Wends and King of the Goths. These titles have not been in use since Margrethe II ascended the throne in 1972. The kings and queens of Denmark are addressed as Majesty (Majestæt), whereas princes and princesses are referred to as His or Her Royal Highness (Hans or Hendes Kongelige Højhed), or His or Her Highness (Hans or Hendes Højhed).

- Eric of Pomerania: By the Grace of God, King of Denmark, Sweden and Norway, the Wends and the Goths, Duke of Pomerania.
- Christopher of Bavaria: By the Grace of God, King of Denmark, Sweden and Norway, the Wends and the Goths, Count Palatine of the Rhine, Duke of Bavaria.
- The full title of the Danish sovereigns from Christian I to Christian II was: By the Grace of God, King of Denmark, Sweden and Norway, the Wends and the Goths, Duke of Schleswig, Holstein, Stormarn and Dithmarschen, Count of Oldenburg and Delmenhorst.
- Frederick I of Denmark: By the Grace of God, King of Denmark, the Wends and the Goths, Duke of Schleswig, Holstein, Stormarn and Dithmarschen, Count of Oldenburg and Delmenhorst, elected King of Norway.
- The full title of the Danish sovereigns from Christian III to Christian VII was: By the Grace of God, King of Denmark and Norway, the Wends and the Goths, Duke of Schleswig, Holstein, Stormarn and Dithmarschen, Count of Oldenburg and Delmenhorst.
- Oldenburg was elevated to a duchy during the reign of Christian VII, and the style was changed accordingly: By the Grace of God, King of Denmark and Norway, the Wends and the Goths, Duke of Schleswig, Holstein, Stormarn, Dithmarschen and Oldenburg. This style was used until his son, Frederick VI of Denmark, lost control of the Kingdom of Norway by the 1814 Treaty of Kiel.
- Frederick VI of Denmark gained control over Rügen 1814–1815 leading to the style: By the Grace of God, King of Denmark, the Wends and the Goths, Prince of Rügen, Duke of Schleswig, Holstein, Stormarn, Dithmarschen and Oldenburg.
- In 1815, Frederick VI relinquished Rügen in favour of the Prussian king, and instead gained the Duchy of Lauenburg from the British-Hanoveran king leading to the style: By the Grace of God, King of Denmark, the Wends and the Goths, Duke of Schleswig, Holstein, Stormarn, Dithmarschen, Lauenburg and Oldenburg. This style was used until 1918 when Iceland was elevated to an independent state in union with Denmark.
- The full title of Christian X from 1918 to 1944: By the Grace of God, King of Denmark, Iceland, the Wends and the Goths, Duke of Schleswig, Holstein, Stormarn, Dithmarschen, Lauenburg and Oldenburg.
- The full title of Christian X following the 1944 dissolution of the Dano-Icelandic union: By the Grace of God, King of Denmark, the Wends and the Goths, Duke of Schleswig, Holstein, Stormarn, Dithmarschen, Lauenburg and Oldenburg. The same style was used by his son, Frederik IX, until his death in 1972
- When ascending the throne in 1972, Margrethe II assumed the style By the Grace of God, Queen of Denmark, abandoning all of the monarch's historical titles.
- Upon ascending the throne in 2024, Frederik X assumed the style By the Grace of God, King of Denmark, Count of Monpezat, a title granted by Queen Margrethe II to all her male-line descendants in 2008.

== See also ==
- Danish Realm
- Throne Chair of Denmark
- List of monarchs of Denmark
- Succession to the Danish throne
- List of orders, decorations, and medals of the Kingdom of Denmark
- Royal Life Guards (Denmark)
- Royal Stables (Denmark)
- Roskilde Cathedral
- Danish colonial empire
- Danish monarchs' family tree
- Royal mottos of Danish monarchs
- Kong Christian stod ved højen mast
- Royal Danish Ceremonial Car "Store Krone"
- Primogenitor
