= Golden Jubilee of Margrethe II =

50th anniversary of the Danish monarch's accession

- Date: 14 January 2022
- Country: Kingdom of Denmark
- Previous event: Ruby Jubilee of Margrethe II

The Golden Jubilee of Margrethe II was celebrated in 2022 in the Kingdom of Denmark, being the 50th anniversary of the accession of Queen Margrethe II on 14 January 1972.

A number of events were planned to mark the Jubilee in several places across Denmark throughout the year.

== Celebrations ==
=== Postponement of planned celebrations ===
The Royal House of Denmark officially announced on 17 December 2021, that the majority of the planned arrangements relating to the Queen's Jubilee would be postponed to the late summer of 2022. A few events took place on the day of the anniversary, such as a meeting in The Council of State, and a reception at the Danish Parliament.

=== Jubilee programme ===
==== 14 January: Accession Day events ====
In the morning of 14 January, the Queen and Crown Prince Frederik participated in a special, formal Council of State meeting on the occasion of the 50th anniversary of the Queen's accession to the throne. This was the 560th Council of State meeting of the Queen's reign. Due to COVID-19, there were only five ministers, including Prime Minister Mette Frederiksen, and, in honor of the occasion, no customary proceedings were held.

Later that morning, the Danish Parliament's official celebration of the Queen's Jubilee took place in the Landsting Chamber at Christiansborg Palace. Upon arrival, the members of the royal family signed the visitor's book. The celebration began with a speech by the Speaker of the Parliament, Henrik Dam Kristensen. Then, prime minister Mette Frederiksen presented the gift from the Danish Parliament and the government to the Queen. The gift is decorative pavement artwork, which will be installed at the North Atlantic House cultural center in Copenhagen, symbolizing the ties between the Faroe Islands, Greenland and Denmark. It is expected to be completed at the beginning of 2023.

Later the same day, there was a wreath laying ceremony, around noon, at King Frederik IX and Queen Ingrid's tomb at Roskilde Cathedral to mark 50 years since the King's passing. The Queen, Crown Prince Frederik, Crown Princess Mary, Prince Joachim, Princess Marie, and Princess Benedikte laid wreaths at the gravesite at Roskilde Cathedral. The Queen gave a deep curtsey before departing the site. The former Queen Anne-Marie of Greece didn't participate as planned in the wreath-laying ceremony as her husband, the former King Constantine II of Greece, was infected with coronavirus, and therefore Queen Anne-Marie couldn't travel to Denmark.

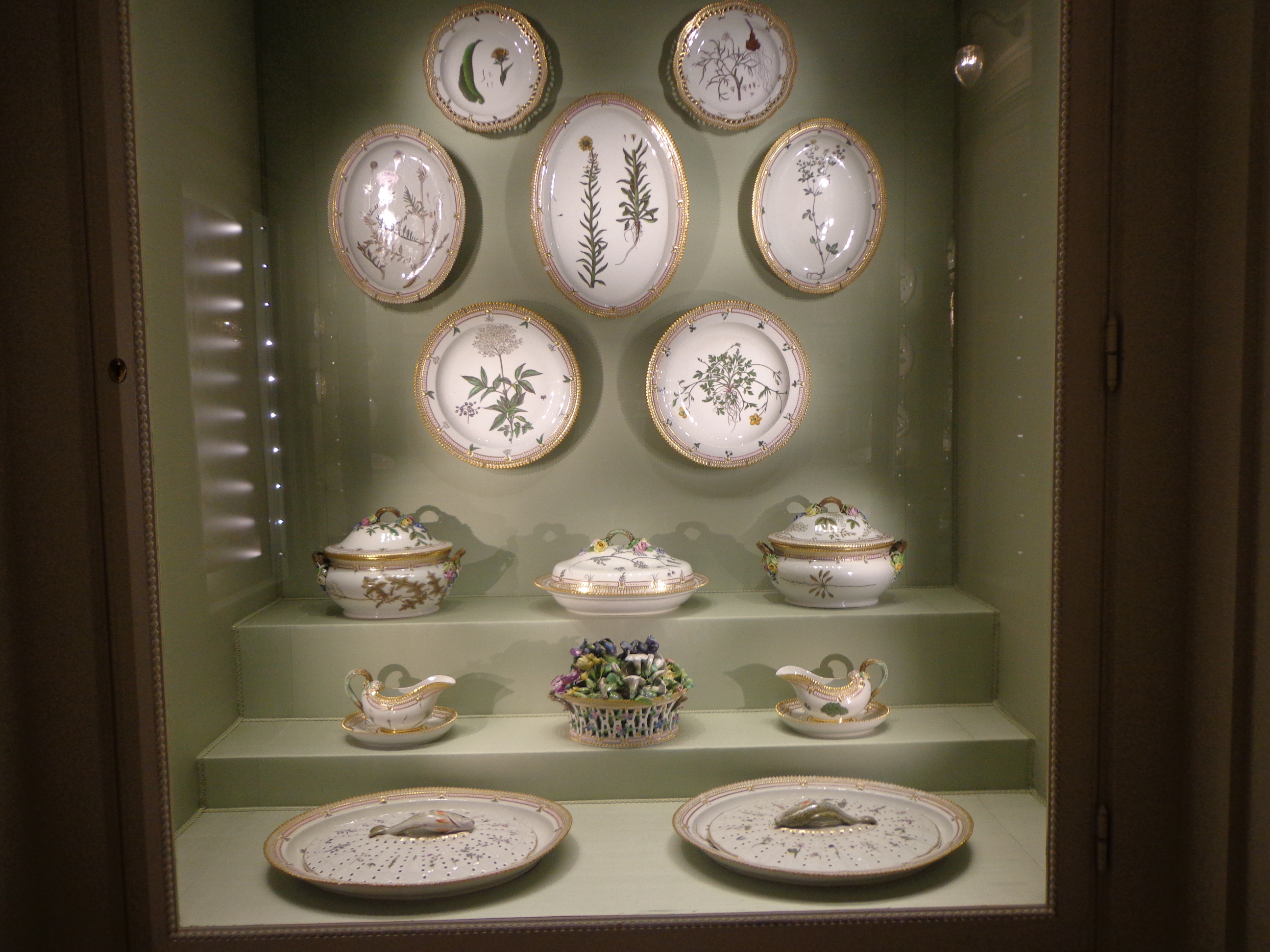
Part of the original Flora Danica dinner set on display in the Flora Danica Cabinet at Christiansborg Palace, 2013

In the evening, the Queen was surprised by her family with a secretly-arranged dinner in Christian VII's Palace at Amalienborg. The dinner table was set with the Flora Danica service, the most valued Danish dinner service. The last time the service was used by the royal family was for Queen Ingrid's 80th birthday in 1990.

People could send digital congratulations to the Queen via the Royal website. Due to the pandemic, it wasn't possible to send written congratulations in person at the Yellow Palace.

==== 21 January: Jewellery exhibition ====
On 21 January 2022, the Queen, Crown Prince Frederik, Crown Princess Mary, and Princess Benedikte attended the opening of the special exhibition "A Queen's Jewelry Box – 50 years on the throne told through jewelry" at the Amalienborg Museum in Christian VIII's Palace.

The exhibition was part of the celebration of the Queen's Golden Jubilee, and the opening was scheduled to take place on 13 January 2022, but was postponed due to COVID-19.

The exhibition displayed more than 200 well-known and lesser-known pieces of jewellery from the Queen's jewellery collection, which the Queen had worn to one or more private or official events during her 50-year reign.

The Queen voiced an audio guide, which was provided to visitors. In the guide, she tells about selected pieces of jewellery and events.

The exhibition was open to the public from 22 January until 23 October 2022.

==== 21 May: Commemorations at Tivoli ====
The Queen's Golden Jubilee was celebrated on 21 May 2022 in Tivoli with events in the amusement park and a ballet gala in Tivoli's Concert Hall. The gala was attended by the Queen and members of the royal family. Among others, the ballet gala featured dancers from the Hamburg Ballet, the Royal Ballet in London, the Paris Opera, the New York City Ballet and the Royal Danish Ballet. The amusement park broadcast the ballet gala on a large screen. The ballet gala will be presented both on 21 and 22 May 2022.

An exhibition featuring selected ballet costumes designed by the Queen throughout her 20 years of artistic work opened at Tivoli.

The day in Tivoli concluded with fireworks.

==== 3–4 June: Celebrations in Aarhus Municipality ====
From 3 to 4 June, the Queen visited Aarhus Municipality, where celebrations of her Golden Jubilee took place.

==== Exhibitions in Cahors ====
During summer, the French city Cahors held two exhibitions, both titled "Margrethe II of Denmark: Artist-Queen" as part of the Golden Jubilee celebrations. At Musée Henri-Martin, a total of 70 works, including paintings, watercolors and decoupage made by the Queen, are being shown from 15 July 2022 – 5 March 2023. The city's library, Médiathèque du Grand Cahors, displayed the Queen's vignettes for Tolkien's The Lord of the Rings trilogy from 15 July – 13 October 2022.

==== Events in September ====
Following the death of Queen Elizabeth II on 8 September, Margrethe II ordered many jubilee events to be cancelled or greatly scaled back. The ceremonial celebration with the Guard Hussar Regiment Mounted Squadron and horse-drawn carriage transport by the Royal Mews were both cancelled in the aftermath of Queen Elizabeth's death.

On 10 September, the Queen and the royal family were expected to appear on the balcony at Christian IX's Palace at Amalienborg, following the changing of the guard at noon, where large crowds of well-wishers could gather to cheer her. This event was cancelled by Queen Margrethe following Queen Elizabeth's death. Margrethe was also expected to take part in a carriage procession to Copenhagen City Hall for an official lunch and another balcony appearance. This event was postponed to a later date. The Queen attended a gala performance in her honour at the Royal Danish Theatre in Copenhagen, where the performance went on in a modified form. The musical performance at Krinsen on Kongens Nytorv, which was planned for the evening, was cancelled.

On 11 September, Queen Margrethe attended a special thanksgiving service at Church of Our Lady – Copenhagen Cathedral, which was modified at Margrethe's request following Elizabeth II's death. At midday, a luncheon was held on the Royal Yacht Dannebrog. In the evening, the Queen hosted a gala dinner at Christiansborg Palace, which was attended by the royal family, foreign guests and Danish dignitaries. This event too took place in a modified form.

On 23 September, the Queen held a soirée for the Government, the Danish Parliament and Danish members of the European Parliament in the Great Hall at Christiansborg Palace.

== Guests ==
While the commemorations in January were only attended by the Queen's closest family, the celebrations in September were attended by her family as well as the Nordic heads of state.

=== Danish royal family ===
- The Queen
  - The Crown Prince and Crown Princess, the Queen's eldest son and daughter-in-law
    - Prince Christian, the Queen's grandson
    - Princess Isabella, the Queen's granddaughter
    - Prince Vincent, the Queen's grandson
    - Princess Josephine, the Queen's granddaughter
  - Prince Joachim and Princess Marie, the Queen's youngest son and daughter-in-law
    - Count Nikolai, the Queen's grandson
    - Count Felix, the Queen's grandson
    - Count Henrik, the Queen's grandson
    - Countess Athena, the Queen's granddaughter
- Princess Benedikte, the Queen's sister
  - Princess Alexandra of Sayn-Wittgenstein-Berleburg and Count Michael Ahlefeldt-Laurvig-Bille, the Queen's niece and her husband
  - Princess Nathalie of Sayn-Wittgenstein-Berleburg, the Queen's niece
- Count Ingolf and Countess Sussie of Rosenborg, the Queen's first cousin and his wife

==== Extended family ====
- Queen Anne-Marie of Greece, the Queen's sister
  - Princess Alexia of Greece and Denmark and Carlos Morales Quintana, the Queen's niece and her husband
  - Crown Prince Pavlos and Crown Princess Marie-Chantal of Greece, the Queen's nephew and his wife
  - Princess Theodora of Greece and Denmark and Matthew Kumar, the Queen's niece and her fiancée
  - Prince Philippos and Princess Nina of Greece and Denmark, the Queen's nephew and his wife
- Prince Wilhelm and Princess Ilona of Schaumburg-Lippe, the Queen's second cousin and his wife
  - Princess Désirée of Schaumburg-Lippe and Michael Iuel, the Queen's second cousin once removed and her husband
- Count Ulrik and Countess Judith of Rosenborg, the Queen's second cousin and his wife
- Countess Désirée of Rosenborg and Peter Rindom, the Queen's second cousin twice removed and her husband
- The Countess of Frederiksborg (former daughter-in-law of the Queen)

=== Foreign royals ===
- The King and Queen of Sweden, the Queen's first cousin and his wife
- The King and Queen of Norway, the Queen's second cousin and his wife

=== Foreign dignitaries ===
- Sauli Niinistö, President of the Republic of Finland, and Jenni Haukio
- Guðni Th. Jóhannesson, President of Iceland, and Eliza Reid

=== Other notable guests ===
- Joen Bille (actor) and Bente Scavenius (art historian)
- Ellen Hillingsø (actress)
- Kasper Holten (stage director)
- Nikolaj Koppel (musician)
- Kjeld Kirk Kristiansen (former director of The Lego Group)
- Anders Holch Povlsen (CEO of Bestseller)
- Ane Mærsk Mc-Kinney Uggla (chairman of the A.P. Møller Foundation)

== Other commemorations ==
In November, the official Jubilee portrait was released. It was taken by the photographer Per Morten Abrahamsen.

On 3 January 2022, PostNord issued a new sheet of three stamps to mark the Queen's Golden Jubilee.

New postage stamps in Greenland and the Faroe Islands were also issued. The Greenlandic stamp depicts the Queen near a fjord surrounded by icebergs, and the Faroese stamp shows the Queen near the ruins of St. Magnus Cathedral in the village Kirkjubøur on the island of Streymoy. The stamps issued are the work of illustrator Martin Mörck, who turned the photographs of the Queen in her Greenlandic and Faroese national costumes by photographer Steen Brogaard, into hybrid photographic and illustrated stamps.

The Royal Danish Mint issued a commemorative coin to mark the Queen's Jubilee. The obverse features the Queen's effigy crafted by the sculptor Kathrine S. Moseholm. On the reverse, there is a pattern created by the number 50, symbolising the Jubilee. The pattern is a nod to Amalienborg's four palaces and the palace square.

To mark the Jubilee, a commemorative medal was released. The medal, which is made of gilded silver and topped with a crown, features a full-length portrait of the Queen surrounded by three silver lions, on the obverse. The reverse features the Queen's crowned monogram surrounded by the collars of the Order of the Dannebrog and the Order of the Elephant and with the inscription "14 JANUARY 1972 – 14 JANUARY 2022".

The Hermitage Pavilions and the Royal Bridge in Fredensborg Palace Garden will be restored to mark the Queen's Golden Jubilee. The restoration is made possible by a donation of 24 million DKK from the A. P. Møller and Chastine Mc-Kinney Møller Foundation for General Purposes. The work on the pavilions and the Royal Bridge started in the spring of 2022, and finished at the end of 2022, but the pavilions will be finished at the beginning of 2024.

== See also ==
- Golden Jubilee of Elizabeth II
- Golden Jubilee of Victoria
- Golden Jubilee of Carl XVI Gustaf
