= De Laborde de Monpezat family =

French family

de Laborde de Monpezat
- Bourgeois family
- Country: France; Denmark
- Earlier spellings: Laborde, Laborde de Monpezat, de Laborde-Monpezat
- Origin: (Kingdom of France) Béarn
- Founded: 1648; 378 years ago or 1655; 371 years ago
- Founder: Jean Laborde
- Current head: Frederik X (Note: Officially a member of the House of Glücksburg)
- Seat: Le Cayrou
- Historic seat: Monpezat
- Titles: List: King of Denmark; Prince of Denmark; Mayor of Pau; Count (customary)
- Connected families: Danish royal family

The de Laborde de Monpezat family (French pronunciation: [mɔ̃.pə.za]) is an old French bourgeois family whose members have included businessmen, politicians, diplomats. The family has also been associated with the Danish royal family through the marriage of Henri de Laborde de Monpezat and Queen Margrethe II.

== History ==
The Labordes are an old bourgeois family originating from the region of Béarn in southwestern France. They took the name of Laborde de Monpezat following the marriage of Jean Laborde, a local physician, to Catherine d'Arricau, heiress of the Monpezat estate, on 16 August 1648.

By a decree of the third cabinet of Napoleon III, the Laborde de Monpezat family legally changed their surname from Laborde de Monpezat to de Laborde-Monpezat in on 14 July 1860, and to de Laborde de Monpezat in on 19 May 1861. Under their new name, the family supplied Mayor Aristide de Laborde de Monpezat to the town of Pau, Pyrénées-Atlantiques in 1875.

Part of the family moved to Hanoi in Tonkin, French Indochina between the 1930s and the 1950s for business, but returned to France due to the unrest caused by the Việt Minh in the First Indochina War.

The de Laborde de Monpezat family became associated with the Danish royal family through the marriage of Henri de Laborde de Monpezat, a French diplomat stationed in London, and Princess Margrethe of Denmark, heir to the throne of Denmark and a student at the London School of Economics, in 1967. Margrethe and Henrik had two children, King Frederik X and Prince Joachim, and eight grandchildren.

== French title of "count" controversy ==
While members of the family have customarily but improperly used the title of Count, French historians and most recent reference authors, specialists of the French nobility, do not consider the family part of French nobility.

In May 1655, Jean Laborde received letters patent by king Louis XIV which elevated three houses and farms which the family owned in Monpezat and Beaufranc as "noble lands". However, reception into the Estates of Béarn was required to be recognized as noble in Béarn, so much so that on 11 July 1672, the Estates of Béarn condemned a person who called himself noble before his reception. The family's petition was rejected by the Estates twice, in 1703 and in 1707. Not all feudal or noble lands allowed to be admitted into the Estates of Béarn as nobility. Only the baronies, the lordships with middle and low justice and "domenjadures" had this right. There is no official record which stipulates that in the letters of 1655 the "nobles lands" of the Laborde family were erected as any of these.

Since late in the nineteenth century, some members of the de Laborde de Monpezat family bear the courtesy title of "count", which was traditionally assumed only by genuine untitled nobles. Neither the nobility of the family nor this French title of count are acknowledged as historically and legally valid by the Encyclopédie de la fausse noblesse et de la noblesse d'apparence (English: Encyclopedia of False and Seeming Nobility) (Pierre-Marie Dioudonnat, Paris, 1976–1979), nor did Régis Valette include the family in his Catalogue de la noblesse française (English: Catalog of French Nobility) (2002). Charondas describes in his book A quel titre (volume 37, 1970) the de Laborde de Monpezat as "false nobles, low folk in the 17th century, not received in the Estates of Béarn due to 'alleged nobility,' and as having never had nobility in their family."

== Legacy ==
Coat of arms of Prince Joachim, featuring a central inescutcheon impaled between his maternal Oldenburg (dexter) and paternal de Laborde de Monpezat arms (sinister).

In 1974 the Danish royal family, under the reign of Queen Margrethe II, purchased the Château de Cayx in Cahors, France as a tribute to her husband's French heritage. The estate was restored by the royal family, and has been become a winery. The castle was central to a period of temporary separation between the royal couple.

On 30 April 2008, the Danish title of Count of Monpezat was conferred by Queen Margrethe II on both of her sons as a way to cherish the French heritage of Prince Henrik. The title was made hereditary for their descendants in the male-line, for both males and females. There was no official publication of the grant in the government gazette, but only a press release by the royal house. The title is now borne by all members of Danish royal family in addition to their princely titles.

Furthermore, Prince Joachim and his descendants bear a coat of arms differenced from those of Denmark's royal shield of arms with Prince Joachim's arms featuring an inescutcheon impaled between the arms of the House of Oldenburg and the Monpezat family, the arms crowned with a coronet of a prince of Denmark. Prince Joachim's children, Count Nikolai, Count Felix, Count Henrik, and Countess Athena bear the titles of Count or Countess of Monpezat, with the style of Excellency.

Finally, while there had been some speculation on whether a change of the name of the royal family would have taken place with the proclamation of King Frederik X, no such change has taken place. The Royal House has not issued any proclamation or statement indicating the name that the royal dynasty has changed, and experts have listed the Danish royal family as Glücksburg or its parent house Oldenburg.

== Members ==
The de Laborde de Monpezat family is a French family, and is still mainly based in the country. However, a notable part of the family lives in Denmark, descending from the union of Margrethe II and Henrik.

=== Heads of the Family (Note: Determined as heirs of the body) ===
Coat of arms of Prince Henrik of Denmark, featuring the quartered arms of Denmark and the de Laborde de Monpezat family arms.

1. Jean Laborde, ca. 1620 - ?
2. Paul Laborde de Monpezat, 1672 - ?
3. Louis Laborde de Monpezat, 1711–1761
4. Antoine Laborde de Monpezat, 1743–1787
5. Jean de Laborde de Monpezat, 1786–1863 (Note: The Laborde de Monpezat family requested to legally change their surname from Laborde de Monpezat to de Laborde-Monpezat in 1860, and to de Laborde de Monpezat in 1861.)
6. Aristide de Laborde de Monpezat, 1830–1888
7. Henri de Laborde de Monpezat, 1868–1929
8. André de Laborde de Monpezat, 1907–1998
9. Prince Henrik of Denmark (né Henri Marie Jean André de Laborde de Monpezat) (1934–2018)
10. Frederik X (b.1968)

=== Danish royal family ===
The Danish royal family is officially part of the House of Glücksburg, but is agnatically part of the de Laborde de Monpezat family.

- Queen Margrethe II (b.1940) ∞ Prince Henrik (1934–2018)
  - King Frederik X (b.1968) ∞ Queen Mary (b.1972)
    - (1) Crown Prince Christian, Count of Monpezat (b. 2005)
    - (2) Princess Isabella, Countess of Monpezat (b. 2007)
    - (3) Prince Vincent, Count of Monpezat (b. 2011)
    - (4) Princess Josephine, Countess of Monpezat (b. 2011)
  - (5) Prince Joachim, Count of Monpezat (b. 1969)
    - (6) Count Nikolai of Monpezat (b. 1999)
    - (7) Count Felix of Monpezat (b. 2002)
    - (8) Count Henrik of Monpezat (b. 2009)
    - (9) Countess Athena of Monpezat (b. 2012)

== Bibliography ==
- Pierre-Marie Dioudonnat, Encyclopédie de la fausse noblesse et de la noblesse d'apparence, 4 vol., Sedopols, Paris, (1976–1997).
- Régis Valette, Catalogue de la noblesse française (2002)
- Valynseele, Joseph (1975). Les Laborde de Monpezat et leurs alliances. Paris: Chez l'Auteur.
