= Princess Athena =

Princess Athena can refer to:

- HH Princess Athena of Denmark (born 2012), the youngest child of Prince Joachim and Princess Marie of Denmark
- The protagonist of the video game Athena
