= Krebs School =

Coordinates: 55.6898°N 12.5756°E

- Krebs' Skole
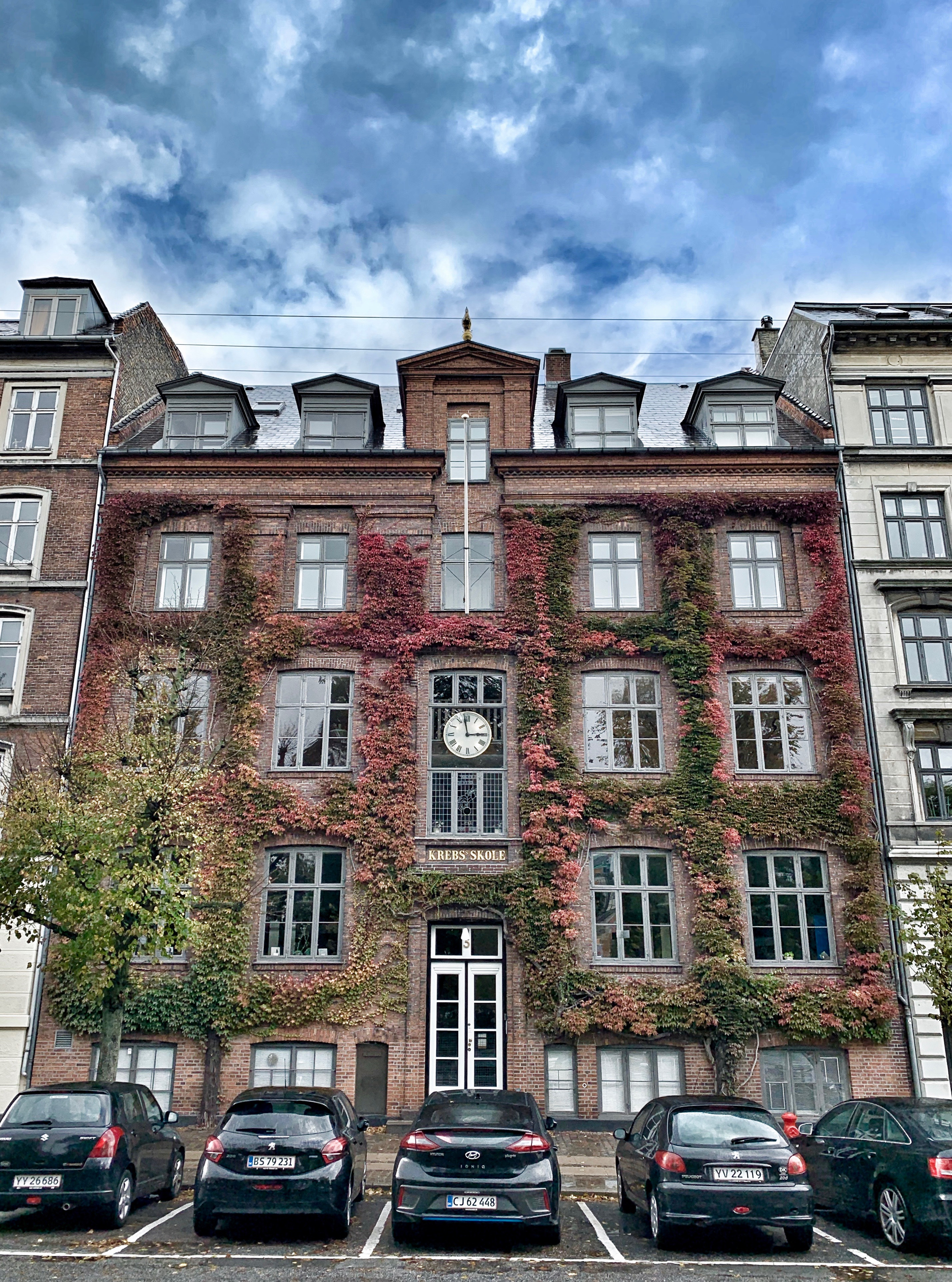
- The school's front facade in 2019.

Location
- Stockholmsgade 5 Copenhagen; Denmark

Information
- Type: Private school
- Established: 15 August 1872
- Founder: Conrad Peter Julius Krebs
- Headmaster: Mikael Fink-Jensen
- Website: https://www.krebs-skole.dk/

Krebs School (Danish: Krebs' Skole) is a private school located in Stockholmsgade in Copenhagen, Denmark. It was founded on 15 August 1872 by Conrad Peter Julius Krebs. Several members of the Danish royal family have attended the school, along with other members of the Danish upper class and nobility. As of 2023, the school's headmaster is Mikael Fink-Jensen.

== History ==
The school was established on 15 August 1872 by C.P.J. Krebs, who had been the headmaster of Metropolitanskolen until 1871. Initially, the school was run out of Krebs' own home on Sortedam Dossering. It soon moved to a location on Tordenskjoldsgade in central Copenhagen and then to Nørregade 20. In 1878, the school secured funding to construct its own building at Stockholmsgade 5. It was designed by architect Charles Abrahams. The school officially moved into the building on 17 September 1878. Stockholmsgade 5 contained all of the school's programs until 1959, when it began expanding into other buildings. Today, the school's campus consists of Stockholmsgade 5, 7, and 9, as well as a smaller pavilion.

== Notable alumni ==
- Frederik X
- Prince Joachim
- Count Nikolai of Monpezat
- Count Felix of Monpezat
