= Succession to the Danish throne =

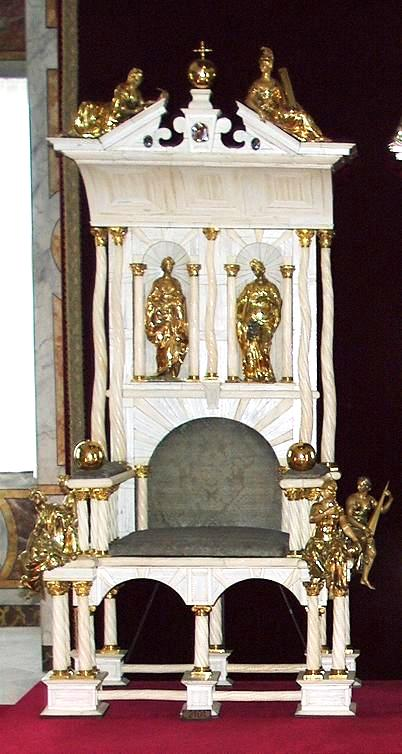
Denmark's anointing throne

The Danish Act of Succession, adopted on 5 June 1953, restricts the throne to those descended from Christian X and his wife, Alexandrine of Mecklenburg-Schwerin, through approved marriages. By a change in the law in 2009, succession is governed by absolute primogeniture.

== Law of succession ==
Dynasts lose their right to the throne if they marry without the permission of the monarch, to be given in the Council of State. Individuals born to unmarried dynasts or to former dynasts who married without royal permission, and their descendants, are excluded from the throne. Further, when approving a marriage, the monarch can impose conditions that must be met in order for any resulting offspring to have succession rights. If there is no eligible person(s) to inherit the throne, the Danish Parliament (the Folketing) has the right to elect a new monarch and determine a line of succession.

== Line of succession ==
People in the line of succession are listed with a number signifying their place in the line.

- King Frederik IX (1899–1972)
  - Queen Margrethe II (born 1940)
    - King Frederik X (born 1968)
      - (1) Crown Prince Christian (born 2005)
      - (2) Princess Isabella (born 2007)
      - (3) Prince Vincent (born 2011)
      - (4) Princess Josephine (born 2011)
    - (5) Prince Joachim (born 1969)
      - (6) Count Nikolai of Monpezat (born 1999)
      - (7) Count Felix of Monpezat (born 2002)
      - (8) Count Henrik of Monpezat (born 2009)
      - (9) Countess Athena of Monpezat (born 2012)
  - (10) Princess Benedikte, Princess of Sayn-Wittgenstein-Berleburg (born 1944)
    - Gustav, 7th Prince of Sayn-Wittgenstein-Berleburg (born 1969)
      - Prince Gustav Albrecht of Sayn-Wittgenstein-Berleburg (born 2023)
      - Princess Mafalda of Sayn-Wittgenstein-Berleburg (born 2024)
    - Princess Alexandra of Sayn-Wittgenstein-Berleburg (born 1970)
      - Count Richard von Pfeil und Klein-Ellguth (born 1999)
      - Countess Ingrid von Pfeil und Klein-Ellguth (born 2003)
    - Princess Nathalie of Sayn-Wittgenstein-Berleburg (born 1975)
      - Konstantin Johannsmann (born 2010)
      - Louisa Johannsmann (born 2015)

=== Note ===
The consent to Princess Benedikte's marriage to Prince Richard of Sayn-Wittgenstein-Berleburg in 1968 was given on the condition that their children (and further descendants) would have to take up permanent residence in Denmark during the age of mandatory education if they were to retain their succession rights. Since the condition was not met, Princess Benedikte's children are not deemed to have succession rights and are not included in the official line of succession. It is unclear whether their own descendants will have succession rights if residing in Denmark during the age of mandatory education. One Danish constitutional scholar, the late Professor Henrik Zahle, claimed that the children of Princess Benedikte do have succession rights, but without providing any arguments for the claim.

== History ==
From the London Protocol in 1852 till 1953, various male-line descendants of King Christian IX had succession rights in Denmark except King George I of Greece (former Prince William of Denmark) and his successors, whose rights to the Danish throne were blocked by Article VI of the 1863 treaty between Denmark, France, the United Kingdom and Russia recognising George I as king of the Hellenes. Article VI stated: In no case shall the Crown of Greece and the Crown of Denmark be united on the same head.

The new Act of Succession terminated succession rights but left the excluded individuals in possession of their titles. This created a class of people with royal titles but no rights to the throne. As a distinction, those entitled to inherit the throne are called "Prins til Danmark" (Prince to Denmark, although this distinction is not made in English) while those without succession rights are referred to as "Prins af Danmark" (Prince of Denmark).

From 1853 until 1953, the Crown passed according to agnatic primogeniture. The monarch in 1953, King Frederik IX, had three daughters but no sons. Before the 1953 Act, the heir presumptive to the throne was Hereditary Prince Knud, the King's younger brother. The Hereditary Prince was far less popular than the King was. Further, his mother-in-law, Princess Helena, was accused of supporting the Nazi movement during the Second World War. These factors, combined with a belief that the Salic law was outdated, resulted in the movement to change the succession law so that Frederik's eldest daughter, the then Princess Margrethe, could inherit the throne. Thus, the Salic law was changed to male-preference primogeniture in 1953, meaning that females could inherit, but only if they had no brothers.

Prince Knud had three children. His sons married without the monarch's permission and lost both their royal titles and succession rights. Only Knud's daughter, the unmarried Princess Elisabeth, retained her rights to the throne. Since her death, the line of succession has consisted only of descendants of King Frederik IX.

Queen Margrethe II's youngest sister, Anne-Marie, married King Constantine II of Greece in 1964. As she was marrying a foreign ruler, although he was himself a prince of Denmark, consent to the marriage was given on the condition that Anne-Marie renounced her and her descendants' rights to the Danish throne.

In 2008, the Danish parliament voted in favour of instituting absolute primogeniture, which would make the Danish monarch's first-born child heir apparent regardless of gender, similar to Sweden and Norway. The bill was voted through two successive parliaments, and submitted to a referendum. The change in succession law did not affect the immediate line of succession as all of Margrethe II's descendants would hold the same positions under both laws. Crown Prince Frederik and Crown Princess Mary became parents to twins born on 8 January 2011. Upon their birth, the twins assumed the fourth and fifth place in the line of succession, according to the absolute primogeniture principle adopted, thereby not giving Prince Vincent precedence over his older sister Princess Isabella.

In 2022, Queen Margrethe II stripped the children of her son Prince Joachim of their princely titles, though they remain in the line of succession (see Count of Monpezat#2023 style changes for details).

== Excluded people ==
Became Count of Rosenborg as a consequence

=== 1863–1953 ===
Grandee	Reason	Date
Prince Vilhelm	elected King of the Hellenes in 1863 as King George I.	30 March 1863
Prince Carl	elected King of Norway in 1905 as King Haakon VII.	18 November 1905
(Kingdom of Greece) Prince Constantine	ascended to the King of the Hellenes in 1913 as King Constantine I.	18 March 1913
Prince Aage	renounced in 1914 due to his marriage to Mathilde Calvi.	1 February 1914
(Kingdom of Greece) Prince Alexander	ascended to the King of the Hellenes in 1917 as King Alexander I.	11 June 1917
(Kingdom of Greece) Prince George	ascended to the King of the Hellenes in 1922 as King George II.	27 September 1922
Prince Erik	renounced in 1924 due to his marriage to Lois Frances Booth.	11 February 1924
Prince Viggo	renounced in 1924 due to his marriage to Eleanor Margaret Green.	10 June 1924
(Kingdom of Greece) Prince Paul	ascended to the King of the Hellenes in 1947 as King Paul I.	1 April 1947
(Kingdom of Greece) Prince Philip	renounced in 1947 due to his marriage to Princess Elizabeth.	28 February 1947
Prince Oluf	renounced in 1948 due to his marriage to Annie Helene Dorrit Puggard-Müller.	4 February 1948
Prince Flemming	renounced in 1949 due to his marriage to Ruth Nielsen.	24 May 1949

=== 1953–present ===
Grandee	Reason	Date
(Norway) Prince Olav	excluded by the new law.	27 March 1953
(Norway) Prince Harald	excluded by the new law.	27 March 1953
Prince Gorm	excluded by the new law.	27 March 1953
Prince Axel	excluded by the new law.	27 March 1953
Prince Georg	excluded by the new law.	27 March 1953
(Kingdom of Greece) Prince Constantine	excluded by the new law.	27 March 1953
(Kingdom of Greece) Prince George	excluded by the new law.	27 March 1953
(Kingdom of Greece) Prince Peter	excluded by the new law.	27 March 1953
(Kingdom of Greece) Prince Michael	excluded by the new law.	27 March 1953
Princess Anne-Marie	renounced in 1964 due to her marriage to King Constantine II of Greece	18 September 1964
Prince Ingolf	renounced in 1968 due to his unauthorised marriage to Inge Terney.	13 January 1968
Prince Christian	renounced in 1971 due to his unauthorised marriage to Anne Dorte Maltoft-Nielsen.	27 February 1971

== See also ==
- Danish royal family tree
