= Princess Marie of Denmark =

Danish princess (born 1976)

- Countess of Monpezat
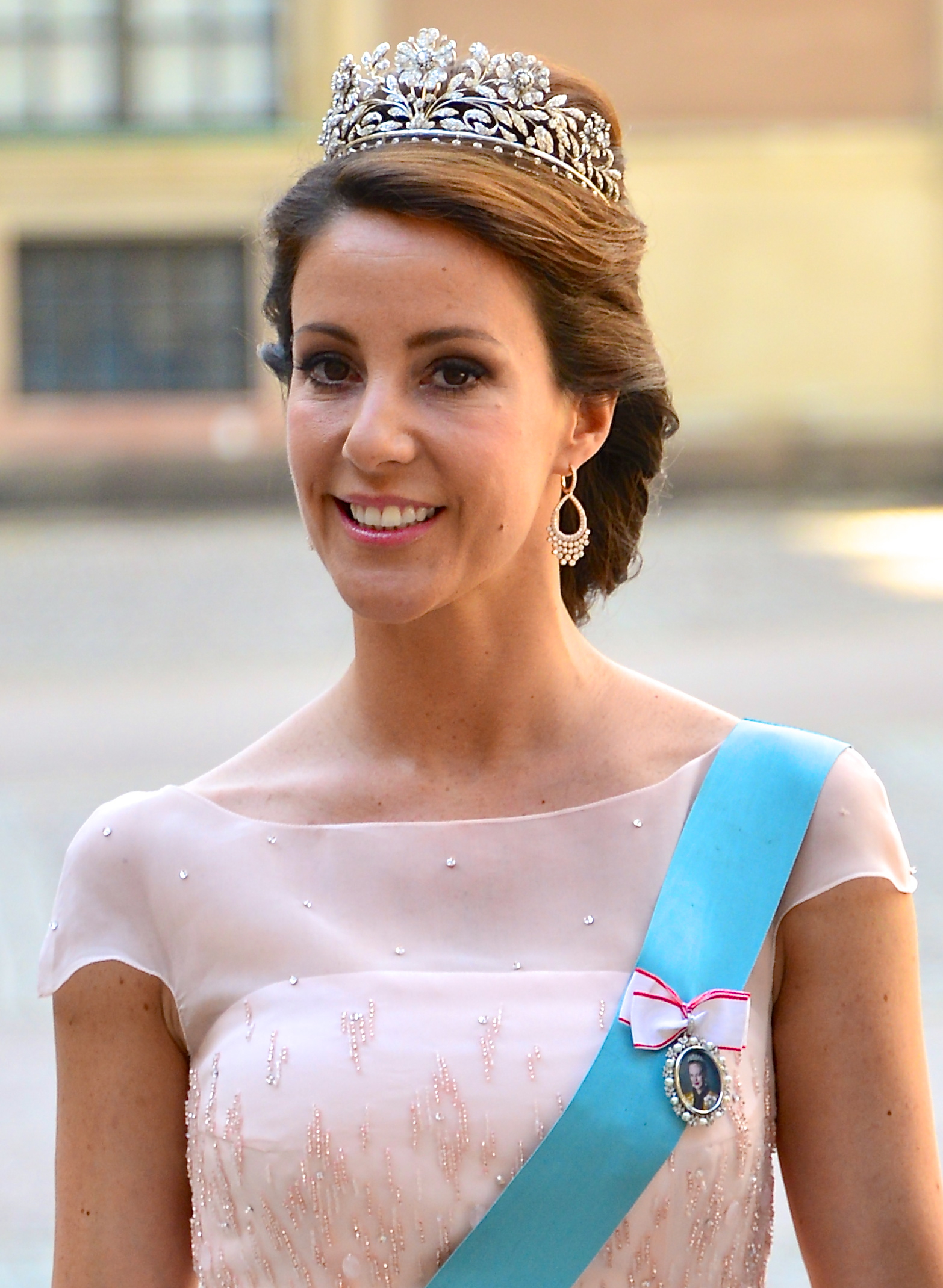
- Princess Marie in 2013
- Born: Marie Agathe Odile Cavallier; 6 February 1976 (age 50); Paris, France
- Spouse: Prince Joachim of Denmark (m. 2008)
- Issue: Count Henrik; Countess Athena
- Father: Alain Cavallier
- Mother: Françoise Grassiot

Princess Marie of Denmark, Countess of Monpezat, RE (born Marie Agathe Odile Cavallier; 6 February 1976) is a member of the Danish royal family. She is the second wife of Prince Joachim of Denmark, the younger brother of King Frederik X of Denmark.

== Early life ==
Marie Cavallier was born in Paris, France. She is the only child of Alain Cavallier, partner in an advertising agency, and Françoise Grassiot (née Moreau), owner of the Château de la Vernède, near Avignon. She is the paternal granddaughter of Claude Cavallier (stepson of Baron de Limnander de Nieuwenhove) and Baroness Odile Brunet de Sairigné (née Labesse). She moved to Geneva, Switzerland, with her mother following the divorce of her parents.

== Education and career ==
After her parents divorced, Marie was sent to the Collège Alpin International Beau Soleil boarding school in Switzerland. She attended Babson College in Wellesley, Massachusetts, in the US for a brief time, to study international business and economics and then went on to study economics in Geneva. Marie earned a Bachelor of Arts at Marymount Manhattan College. During her years in college, Marie worked for Estée Lauder, as assistant to the public relations manager in 1994, and as an assistant to the managing director of ING Numismatic Group SA in Geneva.

After graduating, she started working for DoubleClick Inc, an international advertising agency, in New York as international marketing coordinator. Back in France, she worked for advertising agency Media Marketing. She then worked for Reuters financial news agency Radianz in Switzerland, took a position with REInvest in Geneva and worked as executive secretary in ING Numismatic Group SA until the engagement.

== Courtship and marriage ==
Marie first came to public attention when she was photographed with Prince Joachim in August 2005 on a private holiday in Avignon, France. In January 2007, Marie accompanied Prince Joachim and his children on a ski holiday in Switzerland. Later that year, Marie joined the royal family for Easter at Marselisborg Palace, where she met Joachim's mother, Queen Margrethe II, for the first time. Marie increasingly made weekend visits from Geneva to Denmark in 2007.

On 3 October 2007, it was officially announced that Marie Cavallier was engaged to Prince Joachim. The wedding took place on 24 May 2008 in Møgeltønder Church. Upon her marriage to Joachim, Marie's title is "Her Royal Highness Princess Marie of Denmark, Countess of Monpezat". Upon marrying Joachim, Marie, who had been a French citizen and a member of the Roman Catholic Church, became a Danish citizen and converted to the Evangelical-Lutheran Church of Denmark. Marie's wedding gown was designed by Spanish-Italian fashion house Arasa Morelli, and was sewn by a Danish woman working for the company.

The couple has two biological children, Henrik (born 4 May 2009) and Athena (born 24 January 2012), and Marie is stepmother to Joachim's two sons from his former marriage, Nikolai and Felix.

== Public life ==
=== Public appearances ===
Marie's first engagement and trip abroad was to Morocco on 28 October 2008, when she handed out Lego toys to orphanage children in Rabat. After this trip abroad, the Princess accompanied Prince Joachim to Russia. The Princess' third official trip was to Hong Kong and China together with Prince Joachim in November 2009. In March 2010, Marie undertook her fourth official visit abroad to Mexico City with Prince Joachim. In April 2010, Marie paid a working visit to the UNESCO Headquarters in Paris as patron for the organisation.

=== Patronages ===
Marie's first patronage came shortly after her son's birth, when her patronage of Tønder Festival was announced. Tønder Festival is an international folk music festival near her official residence Schackenborg Manor in Møgeltønder, where the Princess resided with her family. Shortly afterwards, Marie took over one of the Prince Consort's duties as Patron of the Annual Literature Prize that awards an annual prize for French-language literature in Copenhagen. Marie also became a patron of Syddansk Universitet in September 2009. In January 2010, the Danish Ski Federation named Princess Marie official patron. Princess Marie was presented on 17 November 2009 as patron of "The Danish National Commission for UNESCO".

Additionally, she is patron of the Danish Epilepsy Association, Kattegatcentret, the AIDS Foundation, Autism Denmark and the Stop Wasting Food movement (Stop Spild Af Mad).

== Leisure and personal life ==
Marie enjoys bike-riding, running and skiing. She also shares a passion for racing with Prince Joachim.

== Titles, styles, honours and arms ==
Monogram

=== Titles and styles ===
Since her marriage, Marie has been known as "Her Royal Highness Princess Marie of Denmark, Countess of Monpezat".

=== Honours ===
Coat of arms of Princess Marie of Denmark.

She has been awarded:

==== National honours ====
===== Orders and appointments =====
- France:
  - Grand Officer of the Order of the Legion of Honour
  - Officer of the Order of Arts and Letters
- Denmark:
  - Knight of the Order of the Elephant

===== Medals and decorations =====
- Denmark:
  - Dame of the Royal Family Decoration of Queen Margrethe II
  - Recipient of the Commemorative 75th Birthday Medal of His Royal Highness The Prince Consort (11 June 2009)
  - Recipient of the Commemorative 70th Birthday Medal of Her Majesty The Queen (16 April 2010)
  - Recipient of the Commemorative Ruby Jubilee Medal of Her Majesty The Queen (14 January 2012)
  - Recipient of the Commemorative 75th Birthday Medal of Her Majesty The Queen (16 April 2015)
  - Recipient of the Golden Anniversary Medal of Queen Margrethe II and Prince Henrik (10 June 2017)
  - Recipient of the Prince Henrik's Commemorative Medal (11 June 2018)
  - Recipient of the Commemorative 80th Birthday Medal of Her Majesty The Queen (16 April 2020)
  - Recipient of the Commemorative Golden Jubilee Medal of Queen Margrethe II (14 January 2022)

==== Foreign honours ====
Belgium: Dame Grand Cross of the Order of Leopold II

- Egypt: Grand Cross of the Order of Virtues
- Finland: Grand Cross of the Order of the White of Finland
- France
- Greece: Grand Cross of the Order of Beneficence
- Iceland: Grand Cross of the Order of the Falcon
- Mexico: Grand Cross of the Order of the Aztec Eagle
- Netherlands: Dame Grand Cross of the Order of the Crown
- Norway: Dame Grand Cross of the Order of Saint Olav
- Spain: Dame Grand Cross of the Order of Civil Merit
