= Count Henrik of Monpezat =

Member of the Danish royal family (born 2009)

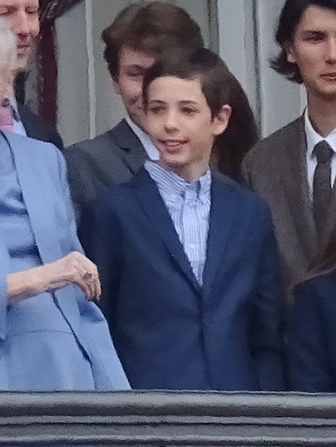
- Count Henrik in 2023
- Born: Prince Henrik of Denmark; 4 May 2009 (age 17); Rigshospitalet, Copenhagen, Denmark
Names
- Henrik Carl Joachim Alain
- Father: Prince Joachim of Denmark
- Mother: Marie Cavallier

Count Henrik of Monpezat (born Prince Henrik of Denmark; 4 May 2009) is a member of the Danish royal family. He is the third and youngest son of Prince Joachim and the only son of his second wife, Princess Marie. He is a grandson of Queen Margrethe II and Prince Henrik and a nephew of King Frederik X. Henrik is eighth in the line of succession to the Danish throne.

== Biography ==
Henrik was born a prince of Denmark on 4 May 2009 at Rigshospitalet, the Copenhagen University Hospital in Copenhagen. He has two older half-brothers from his father's first marriage, Nikolai and Felix, and a younger sister, Athena.

As per Danish royal tradition, his names were not revealed until his christening, which took place on 26 July 2009 at Møgeltønder Church, where his older brother Felix had also been christened. At his christening, he received the names Henrik Carl Joachim Alain. His godparents are his paternal aunt, Queen Mary of Denmark; his maternal uncles, Charles Cavallier and Benjamin Grandet; his mother's lady-in-waiting, Britt Davidsen Siesbye; as well as a family friend, Christian Scherfig.

On 11 August 2015, he started school at Sct. Joseph Søstrenes Skole – a Catholic private school in Ordrup. In 2019, when he and his family moved to France, he was enrolled at the private school EIB Monceau in the 8th arrondissement of Paris.

On Ascension Day, Thursday 18 May 2023, Count Henrik was confirmed in Frederikskirken – The Danish Church in Paris. The confirmation took place at 11:00, administered by the royal Chaplain-in-Ordinary, bishop Henrik Wigh-Poulsen, with the assistance of Frederikskirken's minister, Malene Bendtsen.

== Titles and styles ==
Henrik was styled as "His Highness Prince Henrik of Denmark, Count of Monpezat" until 1 January 2023. In September 2022, Queen Margrethe II decided to restrict the titles Prince and Princess to the direct line of succession to the throne. This had the effect of stripping the descendants of her son Joachim of their princely titles. He is known as "His Excellency Count Henrik of Monpezat". He and Prince Joachim's other children maintain their places in the order of succession.

Count Henrik of Monpezat Born: 4 May 2009
Lines of succession
Preceded by Count Felix of Monpezat	Succession to the Danish throne 8th position	Succeeded by Countess Athena of Monpezat
