= École Internationale Bilingue =

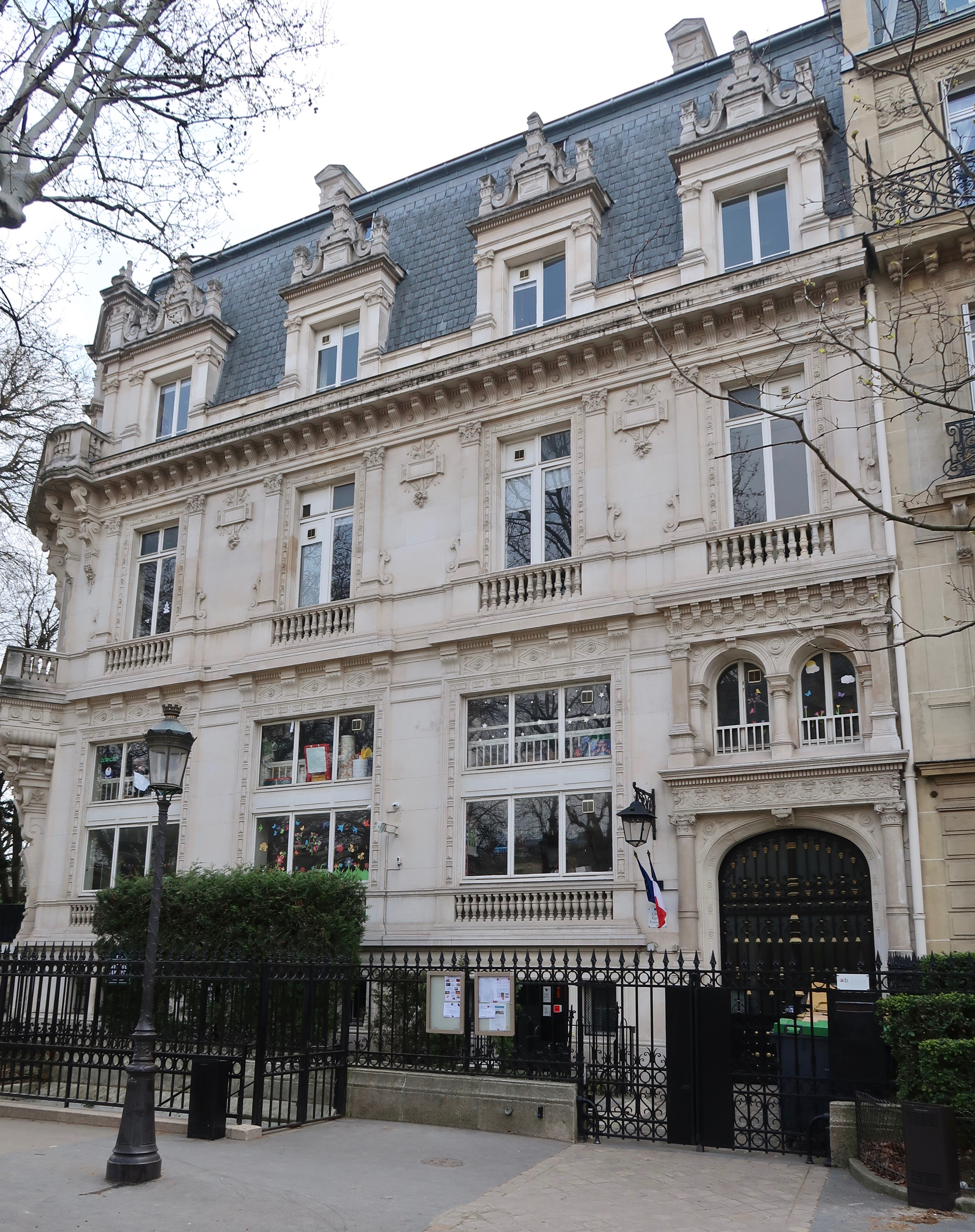
- France

Information
- Established: 1954
- Principal: Bernard Delesalle

The École internationale bilingue (EIB) is a French teaching establishment, primarily based in Paris. The school teaches children from 4 to 18, from kindergarten to Baccalauréat and IB Diploma Programme.

== Origins ==
Following the war, Jeannine Manuel had a mission: to work on international understanding through bilingual education, the mixing of cultures, and a constant educational drive to listen to the world, so in 1954 she created the École active bilingue (EAB) with the two "girls' establishments" which are today the École internationale bilingue (EIB) and the École Jeannine Manuel (EABJM). The first site of the EAB was a building on avenue de La Bourdonnais, which closed at the start of the 1990s.

== Functioning of the school ==
The kindergarten and primary classes take place at 6, Avenue Van-Dyck.

The college is located at 16, Rue Margueritte.

The lycée is at 9, Rue Villaret-de-Joyeuse.

== Alumni ==
- Vincent Ferniot (1960-), French chef
- Antony Blinken (1962-) United States Secretary of State 2021-2025
- Benjamin Cuq (1974-), French journalist and writer.
- Kaysha (1974-), French singer.
- Amanda Sthers (1978-), French writer and director.
- Davy Sardou (1978-), French writer.
- Tristane Banon (1979-), French writer.
- Nicolas Bedos (1980-), French humourist.
- Virgile Bramly (1980-), French actor.
- Eva Green (1980-), French actress.
- Julia Restoin Roitfeld (1980-), French model.
- Julien Sibony (1980-), French director.
- Guillaume Houzé (1981-), French producer.
- Raphaël Hamburger (1981-), French producer.
- Dimitri Rassam (1981-), French producer.
- Ilan Kaufer (1981-) American Politician, Vice Mayor, Town of Jupiter Florida 2013-2021
- Arthur Mamou-Mani (1983-), French architect.
- Marilou Berry (1983-), French actress.
- Salomé Lelouch (1983-), French producer.
