= Countess Athena of Monpezat =

Member of the Danish royal family (born 2012)

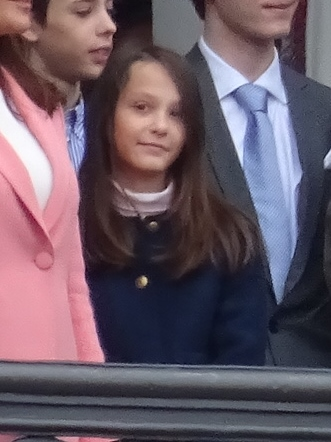
- Countess Athena in 2023
- Born: 24 January 2012 (age 14); Rigshospitalet, Copenhagen, Denmark
Names
- Athena Marguerite Françoise Marie
- Father: Prince Joachim of Denmark
- Mother: Marie Cavallier

Countess Athena of Monpezat (born Princess Athena of Denmark; 24 January 2012) is a member of the Danish royal family. She is the younger child and only daughter of Prince Joachim and Princess Marie of Denmark. She is the youngest grandchild of Queen Margrethe II and Prince Henrik, and the niece of King Frederik X. Athena is currently ninth in the line of succession to the Danish throne.

== Biography ==
Athena was born a princess of Denmark on 24 January 2012 at Rigshospitalet, the Copenhagen University Hospital. When her father met the press following her birth, he joked that the name selected for her could be anything from Jo to Scheherazade. She has two older half-brothers from her father's first marriage, Nikolai and Felix, and an older brother, Henrik.

In accordance with Danish royal traditions, her names were not revealed until her christening, which took place on 20 May 2012 at the Møgeltønder Church, where her older brothers Felix and Henrik were also christened. She was named Athena Marguerite Françoise Marie for both of her grandmothers as well as for her mother. Her godparents are her maternal uncles, Gregory Grandet and Edouard Cavallier; Carina Axelsson, the long-term girlfriend of her father's cousin Gustav, Hereditary Prince of Sayn-Wittgenstein-Berleburg; and friends of her parents, Julie Mirabaud, Diego de Lavandeyra and Henriette Steenstrup.

On 11 August 2017, she started school at Sct. Joseph Søstrenes Skole – the same Catholic private school in Ordrup as her brother Henrik. In 2019, when Athena and her family moved to France, she was enrolled at the private school EIB Monceau in the 8th arrondissement of Paris alongside her brother. She now attends Washington International School, located in NW DC,

== Titles and styles ==
Athena was styled as "Her Highness Princess Athena of Denmark, Countess of Monpezat" from birth until 1 January 2023. In September 2022, Queen Margrethe II decided to restrict the titles Prince and Princess to the direct line of succession to the throne. This had the effect of stripping the descendants of her son Joachim of their princely titles. Since 1 January 2023, she has been known as "Her Excellency Countess Athena of Monpezat". She and her father's three other children maintain their places in the order of succession.

Countess Athena of Monpezat Born: 24 January 2012
Lines of succession
Preceded by Count Henrik of Monpezat	Succession to the Danish throne 9th position	Succeeded by The Dowager Princess of Sayn-Wittgenstein-Berleburg
