= Count Nikolai of Monpezat =

Member of the Danish royal family (born 1999)

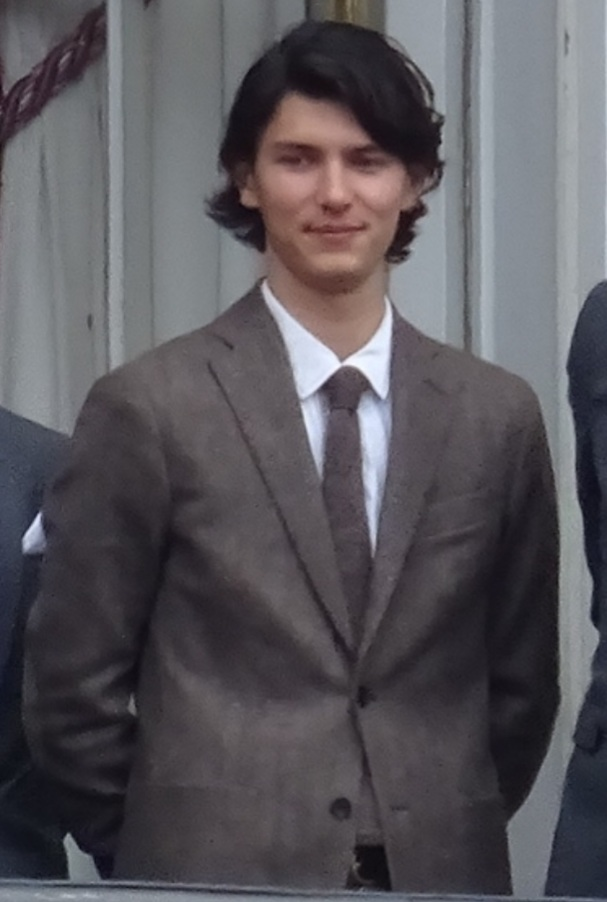
- Count Nikolai in 2023
- Born: Prince Nikolai of Denmark; 28 August 1999 (age 27); Copenhagen, Denmark
Names
- Nikolai William Alexander Frederik
- Father: Prince Joachim of Denmark
- Mother: Alexandra Manley

Count Nikolai of Monpezat SK (born Prince Nikolai of Denmark; 28 August 1999) is a member of the Danish royal family. He is the eldest son of Prince Joachim and his first wife, Alexandra, Countess of Frederiksborg, the eldest grandchild of Queen Margrethe II and Prince Henrik, and the eldest nephew of King Frederik X. He is currently sixth in the line of succession to the Danish throne. At the time of his birth, he was third, after his uncle and father.

== Biography ==
Nikolai was born a prince of Denmark at Rigshospitalet in Copenhagen on 28 August 1999. He is the oldest grandchild of Queen Margrethe II and her late husband, Prince Henrik.

Nikolai was baptised in the chapel of the Fredensborg Palace on 6 November 1999 by the Danish Chaplain-in-Ordinary, Christian Thodberg. At the christening, the musical work Lys på din vej, composed by Frederik Magle and dedicated to the prince, was performed for the first time. His godparents are his paternal uncle King Frederik X, his maternal aunt Nicola Baird, Prince Edward, Duke of Edinburgh, Peter Steenstrup and Camilla Flint. After their divorce in 2005, Prince Joachim and Alexandra had joint custody of the prince and his brother Prince Felix. Nikolai and Felix have two half-siblings, Henrik and Athena, from their father's second marriage to Marie Cavallier.

Nikolai was confirmed on 18 May 2013 in Fredensborg Palace Church in the presence of his immediate family and all his godparents.

Like his father and uncle, Nikolai attended Krebs School in Copenhagen. In 2014, he attended 10th grade at Herlufsholm School in Næstved and received his upper secondary education there as well. Upon leaving Herlufsholm School in August 2018, he started a two-year military program at the Royal Danish Army's Sergeant School in Varde. However, he dropped out two months later as he felt a career in the military did not suit him. In July 2019, he was admitted to Copenhagen Business School to study Business Administration and Service Management. As part of that course, in 2023, Nikolai moved to Australia to take a semester at University of Technology Sydney.

In early 2018, Nikolai signed as a fashion model with the agency Scoop Models. He made his runway debut in February 2018 at Burberry's show at London Fashion Week. He says he sees modeling as a job rather than a career.

In February 2023, Nikolai signed as a model for Elite Model World - Paris under the name of 'Nikolai'. Subsequently, in May he also signed with Barcelona-based modeling agency Sight Management Studio as 'Count Nikolai of Monpezat'.

In June 2024, Nikolai graduated from Copenhagen Business School with a Master of Science in Merchandising degree (cand.merc.). He also completed a semester of study in Australia.

In December 2025, it was announced that Nikolai would make his acting debut in the film adaptation of Hjalmar Söderberg's novel Doktor Glas (1905). The film will premiere in April 2026. Later that month, it was also announced that beginning in 2026, he would take up a position as a consultant in the property section of the Confederation of Danish Industry (DI), with responsibilities including commercial and data-driven work.

== Titles, styles and honours ==
=== Titles and styles ===
Originally styled "His Highness Prince Nikolai of Denmark", Nikolai's style was expanded on 29 April 2008 to "His Highness Prince Nikolai of Denmark, Count of Monpezat". In September 2022, Queen Margrethe II decided to restrict the titles Prince and Princess to the direct line of succession to the throne. This had the effect of stripping the descendants of her son Joachim of their princely titles. Since 1 January 2023, Count Nikolai is known as "His Excellency Count Nikolai of Monpezat". He has said that he was "shocked and confused" to learn about the decision to strip him and his siblings of their princely title. Despite the change in titles, he and the others affected by the change maintain their places in the order of succession.

=== Honours ===
Styles of Count Nikolai of Monpezat
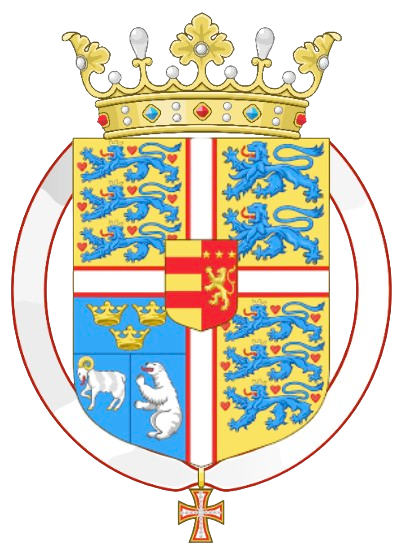
- Reference style: His Excellency
- Spoken style: Your Excellency

- Denmark
  - Grand Cross of the Order of the Dannebrog (26 May 2025) (S.K.)
  - Recipient of Queen Ingrid's Commemorative Medal (28 March 2001)
  - Recipient of Prince Henrik's 75th Birthday Commemorative Medal (11 June 2009)
  - Recipient of Queen Margrethe II's 70th Birthday Commemorative Medal (16 April 2010)
  - Recipient of the Queen Margrethe II Ruby Jubilee Medal (14 January 2012)
  - Recipient of Queen Margrethe II's 75th Birthday Commemorative Medal (16 April 2015)
  - Recipient of Queen Margrethe II and Prince Henrik's Golden Wedding Anniversary Commemorative Medal (10 June 2017)
  - Recipient of Prince Henrik's Commemorative Medal (11 June 2018)
  - Recipient of Queen Margrethe II's 80th Birthday Commemorative Medal (16 April 2020)
  - Recipient of the Queen Margrethe II Golden Jubilee Medal (14 January 2022)

Count Nikolai of Monpezat Born: 28 August 1999
Lines of succession
Preceded by Prince Joachim of Denmark	Succession to the Danish throne 6th position	Succeeded by Count Felix of Monpezat
