= Count Felix of Monpezat =

Member of the Danish royal family (born 2002)

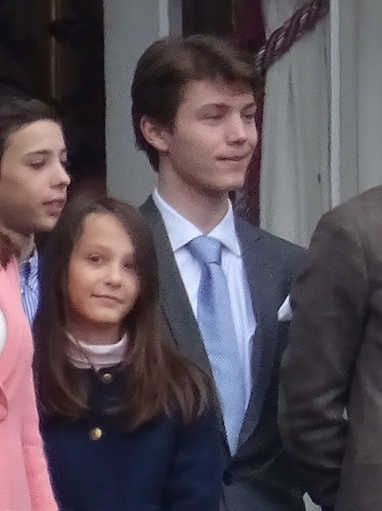
- Count Felix in 2023
- Born: Prince Felix of Denmark; 22 July 2002 (age 24); Rigshospitalet, Copenhagen, Denmark
Names
- Felix Henrik Valdemar Christian
- Father: Prince Joachim of Denmark
- Mother: Alexandra Manley

Count Felix of Monpezat SK (born Prince Felix of Denmark; 22 July 2002) is a member of the Danish royal family. He is the younger son of Prince Joachim and his first wife, Alexandra, Countess of Frederiksborg. He is a grandson of Queen Margrethe II and Prince Henrik, and a nephew of King Frederik X. Felix is currently seventh in the line of succession to the Danish throne.

== Biography ==
Felix was born a Prince of Denmark at Rigshospitalet, the Copenhagen University Hospital in Copenhagen, Denmark, on 22 July 2002. When his father met the press following the birth, he joked that the baby could be named anything from Ib to Nebuchadnezzar.

He was baptised in Møgeltønder Church in Møgeltønder on 4 October 2002 by the Danish Chaplain-in-Ordinary, Christian Thodberg. His names were revealed to be Felix Henrik Valdemar Christian. His godparents are his maternal aunt, Martina Bent; and friends of his parents, Count Christian Ahlefeldt-Laurvig, Oscar Davidsen Siesbye, Damian Sibley and Annick Boel. At the christening, the musical work Dåbens Pagt composed by Frederik Magle, dedicated to Prince Felix, saw its inaugural performance.

After their divorce, Prince Joachim and Countess Alexandra shared joint custody of Felix and his older brother Prince Nikolai.

The prince attended pre-school at the Garnison Church in Copenhagen, and at age six, followed in the footsteps of his father, brother and uncle at Krebs School in Østerbro. In 2018, he began his secondary education at Gammel Hellerup Gymnasium, making him the first member of the Danish royal family to attend a non-private upper secondary school.

In 2021, the Danish court confirmed that he had passed his entry exam to the Royal Danish Military Academy. In October 2021, he left his (2 year long) Army's Lieutenant Training, which he had begun in August, at the Gardehus Barracks in Slagelse, south-west of Copenhagen. He then started modelling with luxury jeweller Georg Jensen.

== Titles and styles ==
Originally known as "His Highness Prince Felix of Denmark", Felix assumed the style "His Highness Prince Felix of Denmark, Count of Monpezat" on 29 April 2008. In September 2022, Queen Margrethe II decided to restrict the titles Prince and Princess to the direct line of succession to the throne. This had the effect of stripping the descendants of her son Joachim of their princely titles. From 1 January 2023, Felix is known as "His Excellency Count Felix of Monpezat". He and the rest of his father's children maintain their places in the order of succession.

=== Honours ===
Styles of Count Felix of Monpezat
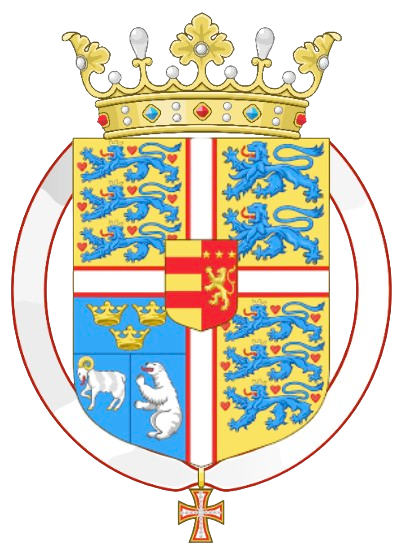
- Reference style: His Excellency
- Spoken style: Your Excellency

- Denmark
  - Grand Cross of the Order of the Dannebrog (26 May 2025) (S.K.)
  - Recipient of Prince Henrik's 75th Birthday Commemorative Medal (11 June 2009)
  - Recipient of Queen Margrethe II's 70th Birthday Commemorative Medal (16 April 2010)
  - Recipient of the Queen Margrethe II Ruby Jubilee Medal (14 January 2012)
  - Recipient of Queen Margrethe II's 75th Birthday Commemorative Medal (16 April 2015)
  - Recipient of Queen Margrethe II and Prince Henrik's Golden Wedding Anniversary Commemorative Medal (10 June 2017)
  - Recipient of Prince Henrik's Commemorative Medal (11 June 2018)
  - Recipient of Queen Margrethe II's 80th Birthday Commemorative Medal (16 April 2020)
  - Recipient of the Queen Margrethe II Golden Jubilee Medal (14 January 2022)

Count Felix of Monpezat Born: 22 July 2002
Lines of succession
Preceded by Count Nikolai of Monpezat	Succession to the Danish throne 7th position	Succeeded by Count Henrik of Monpezat
