= Lyngby Church, Lyngby-Taarbæk Municipality =

Lyngby Church
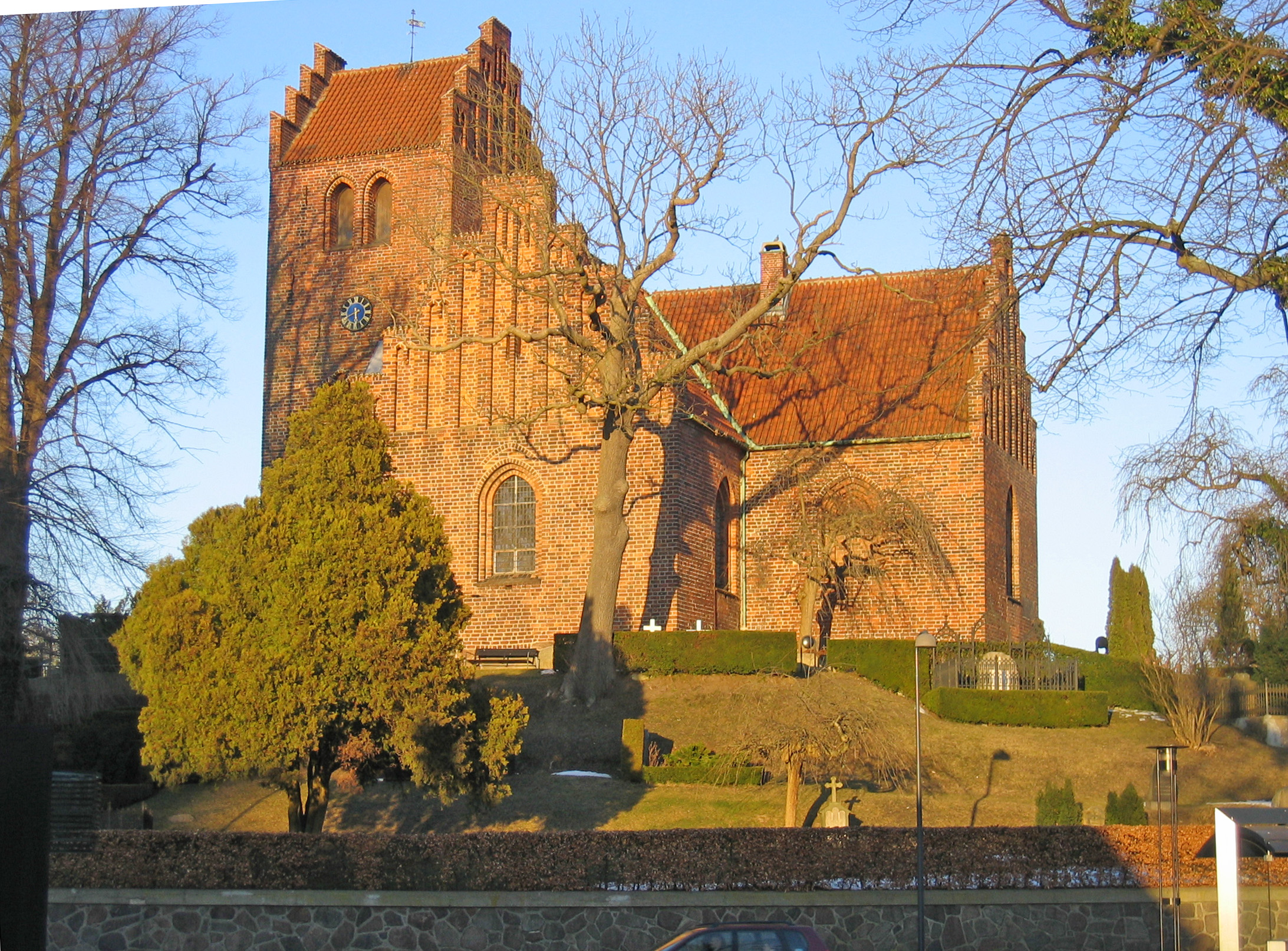
- Lyngby Church
- 55°46′24.5″N 12°30′0″E
- Location: Lyngby Kirkestræde 1, 2800 Kongens Lyngby
- Country: Denmark
- Denomination: Church of Denmark

History
- Status: Church

Architecture
- Architectural type: Church
- Completed: 12th century

Specifications
- Materials: Brick

Administration
- Archdiocese: Diocese of Helsingør

Lyngby Church is the oldest church in Lyngby-Taarbæk Municipality in the northern suburbs of Copenhagen, Denmark. It is perched on a hill above Lyngby Hovedgade (Ltngby Main Street).

== History ==
The church was built in the Romanesque style in the middle of the 12th century. It was lengthened in both ends in the Late Gothic era. A tower was built on the north side of the church in the Gothic period and later heightened in the Late Gothic style. A chapel was also built on the north side of the church in the late Gothic period while a south chapel was added in circa 1765.

The church was probably owned by the crown in early times. The area was crown land and the parish was in 1463 referred to as "Koningx Lyngby" (Royal Lyngby). In 1682–1758, Lyngby Church was annexed to Gentofte.

The church was used by members of the royal family after Frederick, Hereditary Prince of Denmark purchased Sorgenfri Palace in 1789. The most current royal parishioners were Count Christian of Rosenborg and his wife, Anne Dorte, and Christian's sister, Princess Elisabeth, who lived at Sorgenfri Palace until their respective deaths, in 2013, 2011, and 2018. Their funerals took place in the church and they were buried in the Lyngby cemetery.

Bone Falch Rønne, house teacher for Prince Christian Frederik (later Christian VIII), was installed as parish priest of Lyngby in 1802. He founded Bibelselskab for Lyngby og omegen in 1817 and Lyngby evangeliske Tractat-Selskab in 1920. Falch Rønne was later succeeded by Oeter Rørdam.

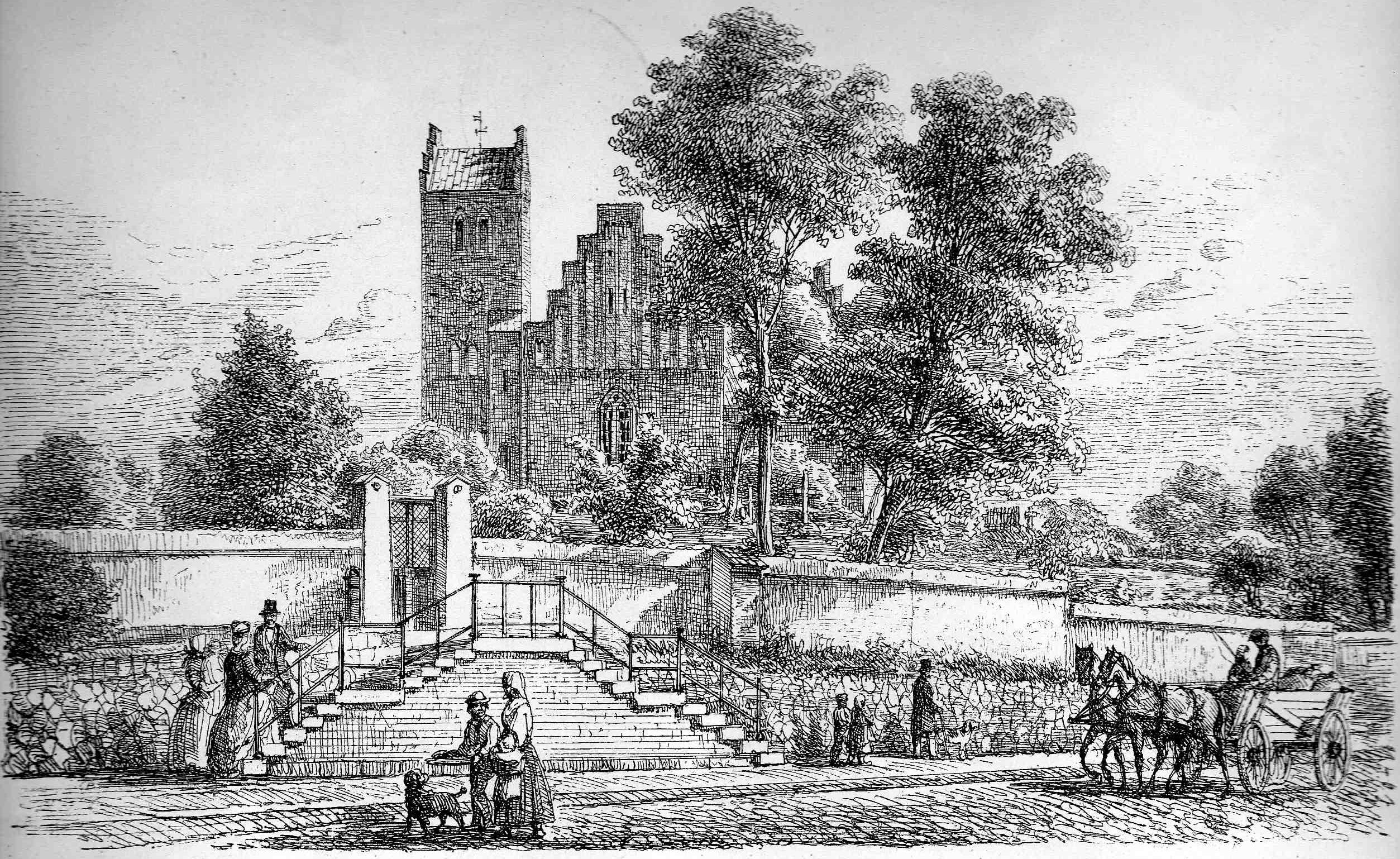
The church seen from the west in 1865. Woodcarving from Danske Kirker, Slotte, Herregaarde og Mindesmærker

Carl Frederik Tietgen owned the church from 6 April 1868.

On 26 April 1901, shortly before his death, he gave it to Lyngby-Taarbæk. On 11 December 1906. Taarbæk Parish was disjoined from Lyngby. In 1903, Lyngby-Taarbæk turned it into a self-owning institution.

== Cemetery ==
The church is surrounded by a small churchyard which consists of a number of concentric terraces connected by stairs. A new cemetery, Lyngby Assistenskirkegård, was established at a nearby site in 1851. Later the Sorgenfri Churchyard was established and in 1954 work on yet another churchyard began, the Lyngby Park Churchyard.

=== Burials ===
- Princess Elisabeth of Denmark (1935–2018), buried with her life partner, Claus Hermansen
- Christian of Rosenborg (1942–2013), former prince, brother of Princess Elisabeth
- Anne Dorte of Rosenborg (1947–2014), wife of Count Christian
- Niels Christian Frederiksen (1840–1905), politician and economist
- Harald Warrer Heering (1923–2014), professor and member of the Danish resistance movement
- Eline Heger (1773–1842), actress
- Frederik Kraft (1823–1854), painter
- Jørgen Carl la Cour (1848–1898), officer, educator and agricultural economist
- Ellen la Cour Overgaard (1876–1944), politician
- Cornelia Levetzow (1836–1921)
- Ferdinand Meldahl (1827–1908)
- Thomas Christopher Mürer (1794–1873), physician and professor
- Victor Nyebølle (1862–1933), architect
- Carl Vilhelm Otterstrøm (1881–1962), biologist
- Ib Rehné (1922–2005), journalist
- Bone Falch Rønne (1764–1833), priest
- Holger Frederik Rørdam (1830–1913), theologian and writer
- Peter Rørdam (1806–1883), priest
- Carl Frederik Tietgen (1829–1901), businessman

== Cultural references ==
Lyngby was used as a location for the wedding in the 1961 drama film Landsbylægen.
