= Wedding of Princess Margrethe and Henri de Laborde de Monpezat =

1967 Danish royal wedding

Wedding of Princess Margrethe of Denmark and Henri de Laborde de Monpezat
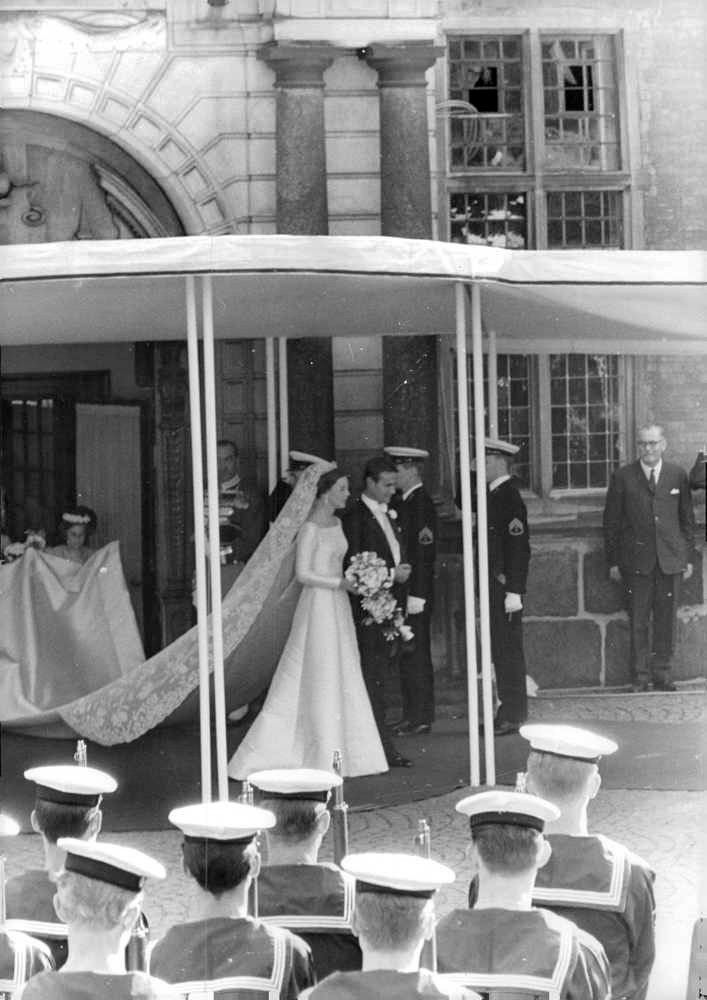
- Margrethe and Henri (Henrik) leave Holmen Church
- Date: 10 June 1967; 59 years ago
- Venue: Holmen Church
- Location: Copenhagen, Denmark
- Participants: Princess Margrethe of Denmark (later Queen Margrethe II); Henri de Laborde de Monpezat (later Prince Henrik of Denmark)

The wedding of Princess Margrethe of Denmark (later Queen Margrethe II) and Henri de Laborde de Monpezat (later Prince Henrik of Denmark) took place on Saturday, 10 June 1967, at the Holmen Church in Copenhagen, Denmark.

== Engagement ==
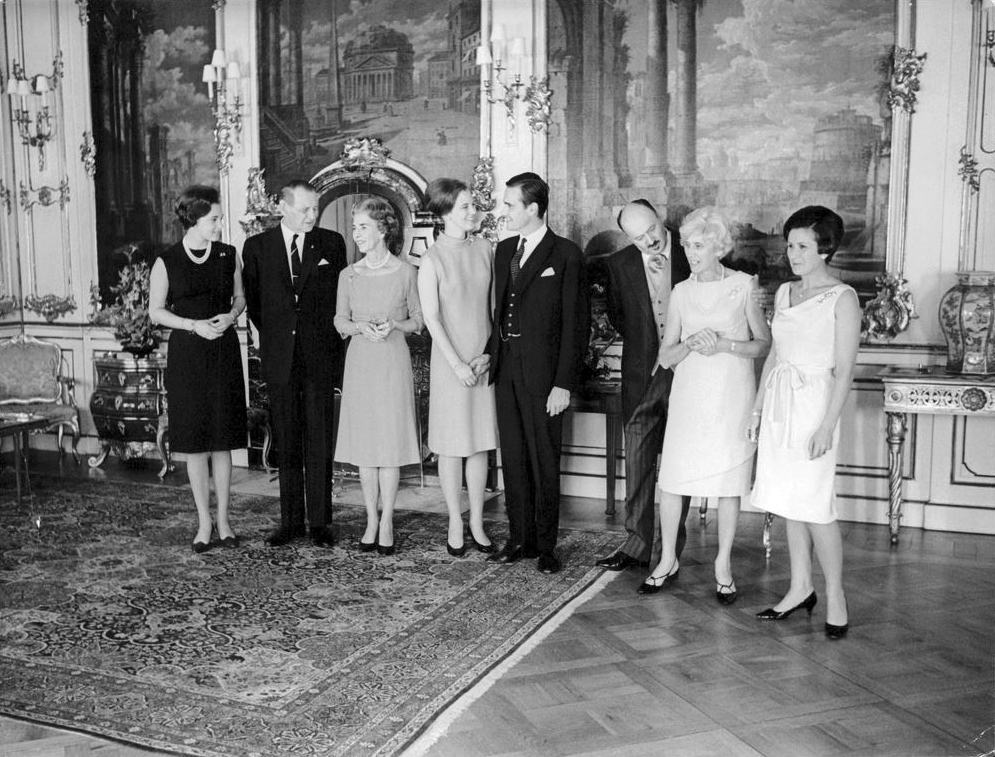
Margrethe and Henri, with their families, at a photocall after the announcement of their engagement, 7 October 1966

Princess Margrethe, eldest daughter and heiress presumptive of King Frederik IX of Denmark, first met French diplomat Henri de Laborde de Monpezat at a dinner at the French embassy in London in 1965 while the princess was a student at the London School of Economics. The couple were seen embracing at Copenhagen Airport in September 1966. Their engagement was announced on 4 October 1966.

That same day, the Folketing granted their consent to the union. On the morning of 5 October, the King asked the Council of State for their formal consent to the marriage, which was granted. The couple and their families appeared on the balcony of the Amalienborg and drove in open cars through the streets of Copenhagen to a luncheon at Fredensborg Palace.

Henri presented Princess Margrethe with a toi et moi style diamond engagement ring made by Van Cleef & Arpels. The ring features two square-cut diamonds mounted diagonally on a yellow gold band.

The wedding was set for 25 May 1967, the day after Margrethe's parent's 32nd wedding anniversary, but was pushed back to June as her youngest sister, Queen Anne-Marie of the Hellenes, was expecting. Her son, Pavlos, Crown Prince of Greece, was born on 20 May 1967.

=== Pre-wedding celebrations ===
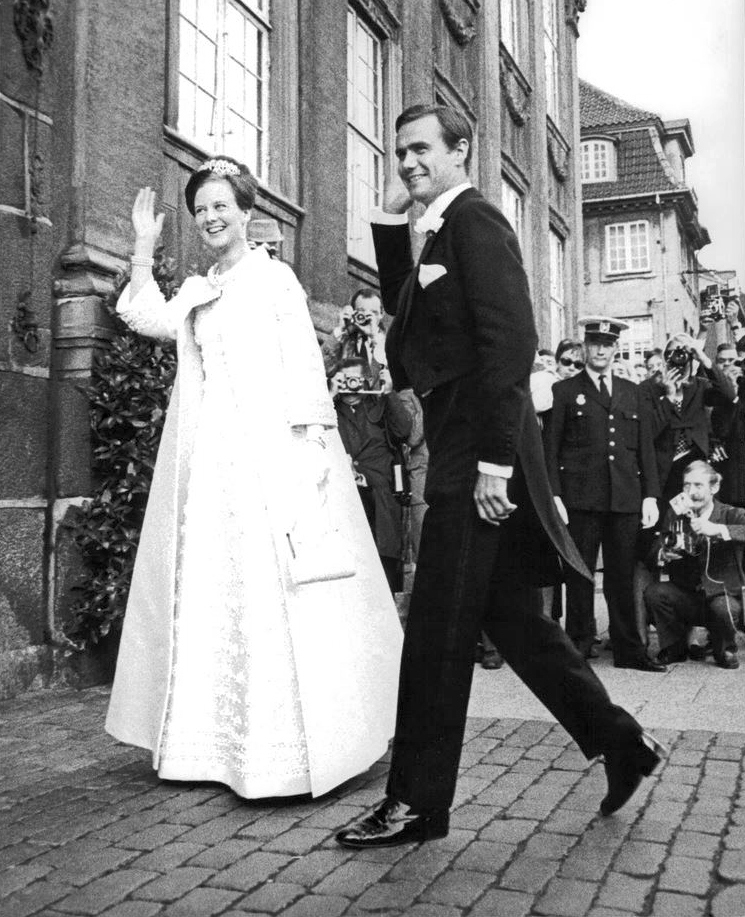
Margrethe and Henri at the French Embassy in Copenhagen, 7 June 1967

Henri moved full-time to Copenhagen at the end of May 1967, he also converted from Catholicism to Lutheranism and changed the spelling of his name from the French Henri to the Danish Henrik.

Several pre-wedding dinners, balls and galas were held in the couple's honour. This began when the King and Queen hosted a gala for the diplomatic corp at Christiansborg Palace on 30 May, followed by a special performance by the Royal Danish Ballet at the Royal Danish Theatre on 31 May, a gala for the Danish government at Christiansborg Palace on 2 June, a dinner at Fredensborg Palace to celebrate the engagement of Margrethe's younger sister, Princess Benedikte, to Prince Richard of Sayn-Wittgenstein-Berleburg on 5 June, and a ball at the French Embassy on 7 June.

== Wedding ==
Princess Margrethe and Henri de Laborde de Monpezat were married on Saturday, 10 June 1967, at 17:00 local time at the Holmen Church. The Evangelical-Lutheran Church in Denmark ceremony was performed by Erik Jensen, Bishop of Aalborg and Chaplin of the Royal Court. The ceremony lasted just 20 minutes.

=== Music ===
Princess Margrethe and her father walked down the aisle to a sixteenth-century musical setting of Psalm 42. Two hymns were sung during the service. The couple left the church to Charles-Marie Widor's "Toccata" from Symphonie pour orgue No. 5.

=== Attire ===
Princess Margrethe wore a silk wedding gown with a six-meter train by Danish fashion designer Jørgen Bender. She wore the Irish lace veil her maternal grandmother, Princess Margaret of Connaught, wore at her wedding in 1905. She also wore the diamond tiara by Cartier her grandmother had received as a wedding gift from the Khedive of Egypt and a diamond daisy brooch belonging to her mother made with diamonds that had belonged to Margaret of Connaught.

Henri wore evening dress with the riband and star of the Order of the Elephant, which King Frederik IX had bestowed upon him that day.

=== Attendants ===
Princess Margrethe had four teenage bridesmaids: Kristin Dahl, Countess Désirée of Rosenborg (daughter of Count Flemming of Rosenborg), Anne and Carina Oxholm Tillisch. Henri's best man was his brother Etienne de Laborde de Monpezat.

=== Reception ===
The wedding reception for 400 guests was held at Fredensborg Palace. Upon their marriage, Henri assumed the title of Prince of Denmark and adopted his Danish name Henrik. Prince Henrik gave a speech where he stated his new wife was the "single most beautiful adornment" in the "blooming garden" that is Denmark. This was referenced during his funeral when he requested floral arrangements in the Christiansborg Palace Chapel be arranged like a blooming garden.

== Guests ==
The wedding was attended by members of the couple's families, foreign royal families, and Danish and French dignitaries. The bride's sister and brother-in-law, Queen Anne-Marie and King Constantine II of Greece, were notably absent due to political instability in their country following a coup d'état on 21 April 1967. Queen Ingrid placed photos of the Greek royal couple around Fredensborg Palace during the reception to ensure their absence was felt. Notable guests in attendance included:

=== Relatives of the bride ===
==== Danish royal family ====
- The King and Queen of Denmark, the bride's parents
  - Princess Benedikte of Denmark and the Hereditary Prince of Sayn-Wittgenstein-Berleburg, the bride's sister and her fiancé
- The Hereditary Prince and Hereditary Princess of Denmark, the bride's paternal uncle and aunt
  - Princess Elisabeth of Denmark, the bride's paternal first cousin
  - Prince Ingolf of Denmark, the bride's paternal first cousin
  - Prince Christian of Denmark, the bride's paternal first cousin
- Prince Gorm of Denmark, the bride's paternal first cousin once removed
- Count and Countess Oluf of Rosenborg, the bride's paternal first cousin once removed and his wife
- Mr and Mrs Christian Castenskjold, the bride's second cousin once removed and his wife
- Count and Countess Valdemar of Rosenborg, the bride's paternal second cousin once removed and his wife
- Princess Axel of Denmark, the bride's paternal first cousin once removed (and widow of the bride's first cousin twice removed)
  - Prince and Princess Georg of Denmark, the bride's paternal second cousin and his wife
  - Count and Countess Flemming of Rosenborg, the bride's paternal second cousin and his wife
    - Countess Désirée of Rosenborg, the bride's paternal second cousin once removed
- Countess Alexandra, Mrs Ivar Vind, and Mr Ivar Vind, the bride's paternal second cousin once removed and her husband
- Count and Countess Christian of Rosenborg, the bride's paternal second cousin once removed and his wife
- Prince Viggo, Count of Rosenborg, the bride's paternal first cousin twice removed
- Princess René of Bourbon-Parma, the bride's paternal first cousin twice removed

==== Swedish royal family ====
- The King of Sweden, the bride's maternal grandfather
  - The Duchess of Västerbotten, the bride's maternal aunt-by-marriage (and widow of the bride's maternal uncle)
    - Princess Margaretha, Mrs Ambler, and Mr John Ambler, the bride's maternal first cousin and her husband
    - Princess Birgitta and Prince Johann Georg of Hohenzollern, the bride's maternal first cousin and her husband
    - Princess Désirée, Baroness Silfverschiöld, and Baron Niclas Silfverschiöld, the bride's maternal first cousin and her husband
    - Princess Christina of Sweden, the bride's maternal first cousin
    - The Crown Prince of Sweden, the bride's maternal first cousin
  - Count and Countess Sigvard Bernadotte of Wisborg, the bride's maternal uncle and aunt
  - The Duke of Halland, the bride's maternal uncle
  - Count and Countess Carl Johan Bernadotte of Wisborg, the bride's maternal uncle and aunt

=== Relatives of the groom ===
- André and Renée de Laborde de Monpezat, the groom's parents
  - Françoise Bardin, the groom's sister
  - Maurille Beauvillain, the groom's sister
  - Étienne de Laborde de Monpezat, the groom's brother
  - Jean-Baptiste de Laborde de Monpezat, the groom's brother

=== Foreign royal guests ===
==== Members of reigning royal houses ====
- (Belgium) The King and Queen of the Belgians, the bride's paternal second cousin and his wife
- The Grand Duke and Grand Duchess of Luxembourg, the bride's maternal third cousin once removed and paternal second cousin
- The Queen of the Netherlands, the bride's paternal first cousin twice removed
  - Princess Beatrix and Prince Claus of the Netherlands, the bride's paternal second cousin once removed and her husband
- The King of Norway, the bride's paternal first cousin once removed
  - The Crown Prince of Norway, the bride's paternal second cousin
- Princess Marina, Duchess of Kent, the bride's paternal second cousin once removed (representing the Queen of the United Kingdom)
- (United Kingdom) Captain Alexander Ramsay of Mar and the Mistress of Saltoun, the bride's maternal first cousin once removed and his wife

==== Members of non-reigning royal houses ====
- The Prince and Princess of Asturias, the bride's third cousins
- The Prince and Princess of Prussia, the bride's paternal first cousin once removed and maternal second cousin once removed
- Duke and Duchess Christian of Mecklenburg-Schwerin, the bride's paternal first cousin once removed and maternal third cousin
- Princess Tatiana Radziwiłł and Dr Jean Henri Fruchaud, the bride's paternal third cousin and her husband

== See also ==
- Wedding of Frederik, Crown Prince of Denmark, and Mary Donaldson
