= Wedding of Constantine II and Princess Anne-Marie =

1964 Royal wedding

- The couple's dual cypher
- Date: 18 September 1964; 62 years ago
- Venue: Metropolitan Cathedral of Athens
- Location: Athens, Kingdom of Greece
- Participants: Constantine II of Greece; Princess Anne-Marie of Denmark

The wedding of Constantine II, King of the Hellenes, and Princess Anne-Marie of Denmark took place on Friday, 18 September 1964, at the Metropolitan Cathedral of Athens.

Constantine II was the reigning Greek monarch, while Princess Anne-Marie was the youngest daughter of King Frederik IX and Queen Ingrid of Denmark. It was the second, and to date, the last wedding of a reigning Greek monarch, and the first to be held in Greece.

Chrysostomos II, Archbishop of Athens and All Greece, presided over the Church of Greece ceremony. The ceremony was attended by the bride's and groom's families, as well as members of foreign royal families, diplomats, and various Greek and Danish officials.

== Engagement ==
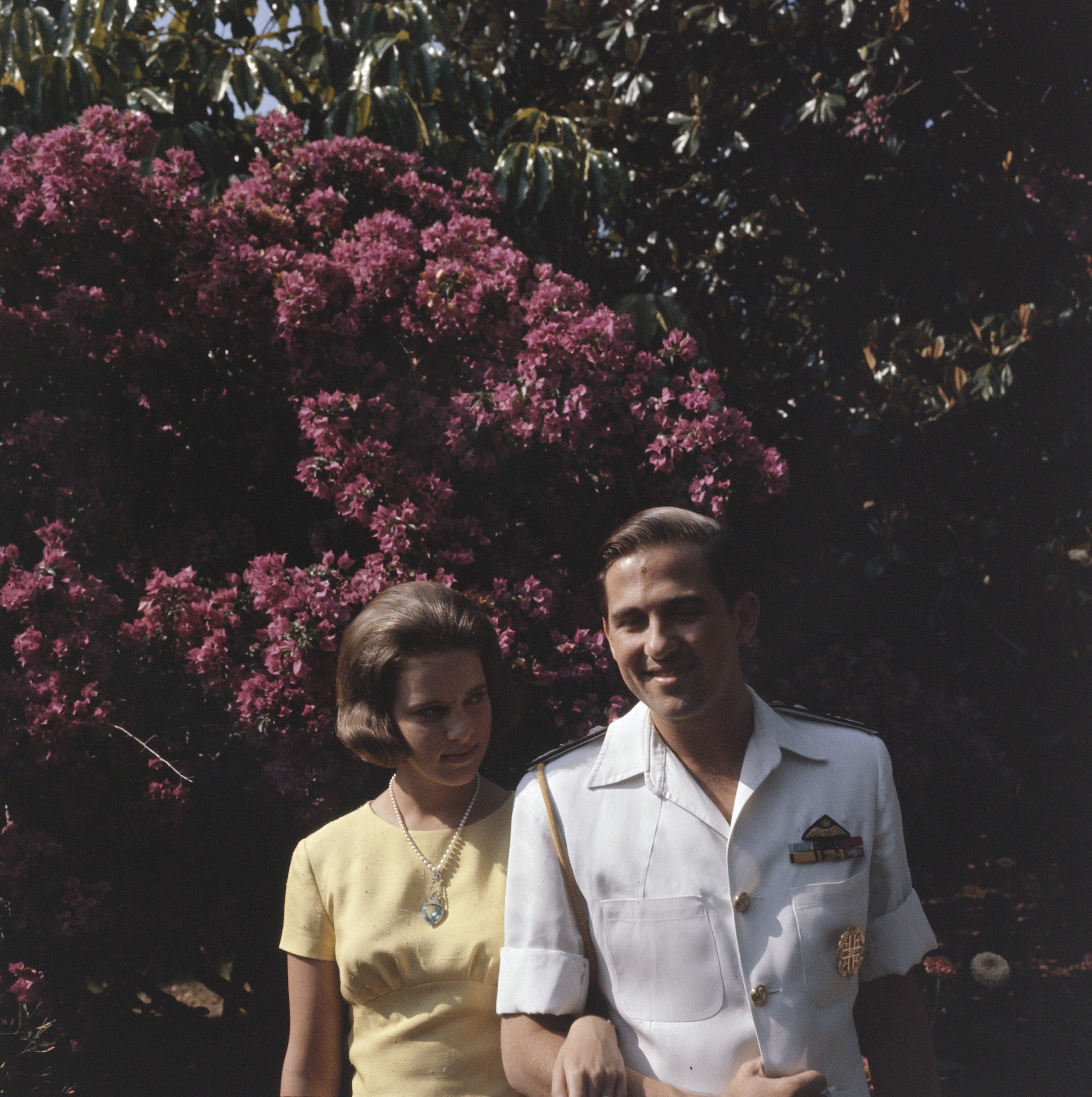
The couple during their engagement, 1964

The couple, third cousins through both Queen Victoria of the United Kingdom and King Christian IX of Denmark, first met in 1959 at a performance of the Circus Benneweis at Gråsten Palace. Then Crown Prince was 18 and Princess Anne-Marie was just 12 at the time. They met again in 1961, and in 1962, Anne-Marie was a bridesmaid at the wedding of Constantine's older sister, Princess Sophia, to Infante Juan Carlos of Spain. In 1962, Princess Anne-Marie was on holiday with her governess in Norway, where Crown Prince Constantine was attending a yacht racing event. He proposed and she accepted. King Frederik IX initially withheld his consent, as Anne-Marie was only 15 at the time, but eventually relented on the conditions that she finish her education and the wedding not be held before her 18th birthday.

On 23 January 1963, the Danish royal court announced the engagement. The wedding was initially set for January 1965. Following the death of Constantine's father, King Paul, on 6 March 1964, the date was moved forward to 18 September 1964.

== Pre-wedding celebrations ==
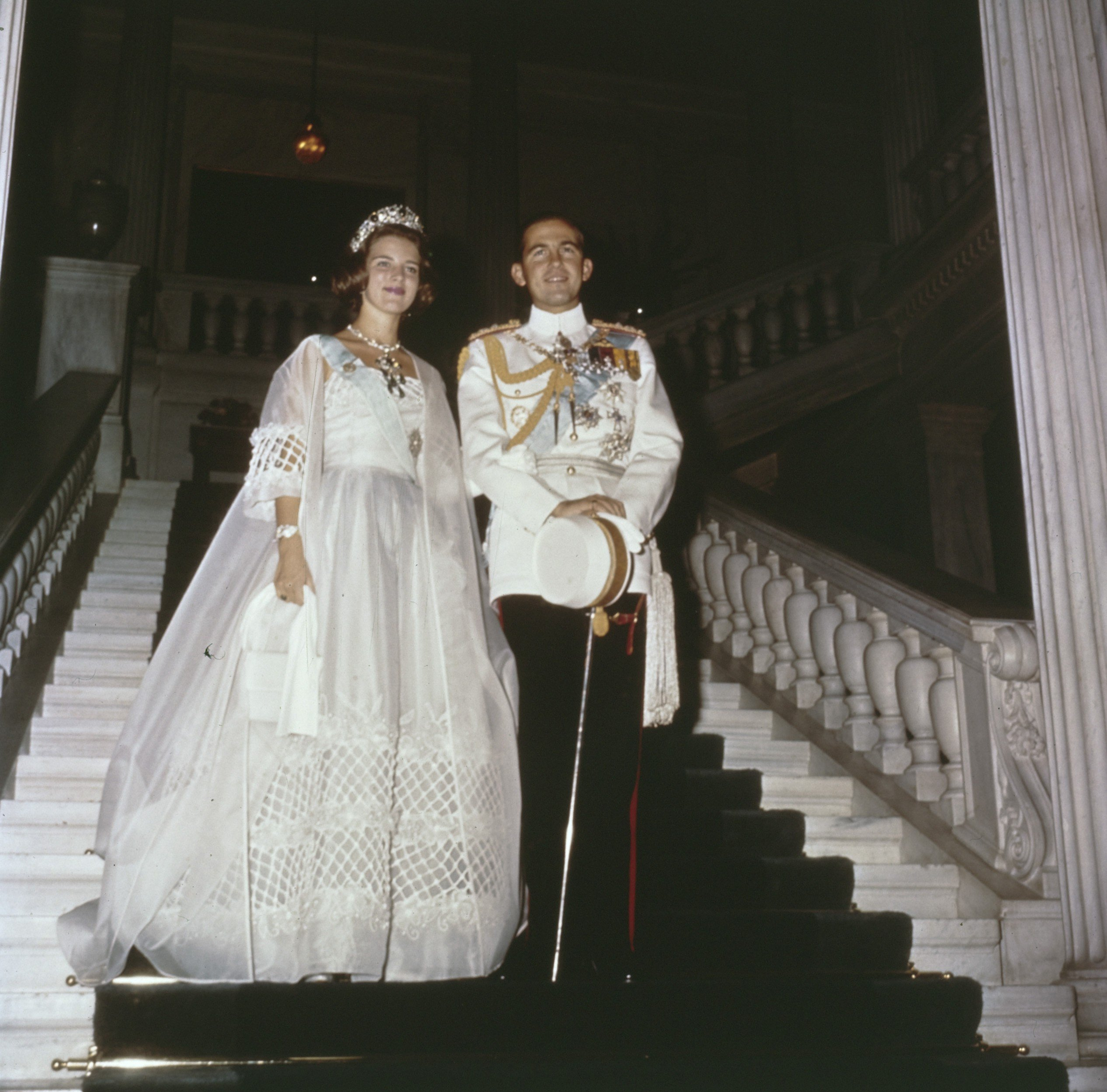
Constantine and Anne-Marie at their pre-wedding gala at the Royal Palace.

=== In Denmark ===
The celebrations began in early September 1964. On 7 September, Constantine arrived in Denmark where a private dinner was held at Fredensborg Palace. The next day, there was a gala performance at the Royal Danish Theatre followed by a banquet at Christiansborg Palace. The next morning, a reception was held at Copenhagen City Hall.

=== In Greece ===
King Constantine II, Princess Anne-Marie, together with her parents King Frederik IX, Queen Ingrid, and her elder sisters Princess Margrethe and Princess Benedikte sailed to Greece on board the Danish royal yacht Dannebrog. A reception was held in honour of the Danish royal family at the Hotel Grande Bretagne.

On 16 September, most of the royal guests arrived in Greece by plane. That evening, a gala was held at the Royal Palace for 1,600 invited guests.

== Wedding ==
Constantine and Anne-Marie were married on 18 September 1964, two weeks after Anne-Marie's 18th birthday.

=== Ceremony ===
The Greek Orthodox marriage ceremony took place in the Metropolitan Cathedral of Athens, and was conducted by Chrysostomos II, Archbishop of Athens and All Greece.

=== Attire ===
Princess Anne-Marie wore a relatively unadorned gown by Danish designer Holger Blom, assisted by Jørgen Bender. Her Irish lace veil, worn by her maternal grandmother, Princess Margaret of Connaught at her wedding in 1905, was anchored by a Cartier diamond tiara given to Princess Margaret by the Abbas II, Khedive of Egypt. The veil had also been worn by her mother, Queen Ingrid, in 1935. The veil and tiara together have been worn by all of Ingrid's female descendants.

King Constantine II wore the ceremonial uniform of stratarches (field marshal) of the Hellenic Army. He wore the insignia of the Greek Order of the Redeemer, Order of Saints George and Constantine, Order of George I and the Commemorative Badge of the Centenary of the Royal House of Greece, as well as with the insignia of the Danish Order of the Elephant and Order of the Dannebrog.

=== Wedding party ===
==== Bridesmaids ====
- Princess Anne of the United Kingdom
- Princess Christina of Sweden
- Princess Irene of Greece and Denmark
- Princess Margareta of Romania
- Princess Clarissa of Hesse-Kassel
- Princess Tatiana Radziwiłł

==== Crown bearers ====
- The Crown Prince of Norway
- The Crown Prince of Sweden
- Crown Prince Alexander of Yugoslavia
- The Prince of Wales
- Prince Michael of Greece and Denmark
- Prince Ingolf of Denmark
- Prince Michael of Kent
- Prince Karl of Hesse-Kassel
- Count Michael Bernadotte af Wisborg

== Guests ==
The wedding was attended by 1200 guests from around the world. As both the bride and groom were descendants of Victoria of the United Kingdom and Christian IX of Denmark, they were closely related to almost all of the royal houses in Europe, many of whom were in attendance. (Note: The bride and groom are related to all the European royal guests. A guest's closest relation to either the bride or groom is the only relation denoted in the list below.)

=== Relatives of the bride ===
==== House of Glücksburg ====
- The King and Queen of Denmark, the bride's parents
  - Princess Margrethe of Denmark, the bride's sister
  - Princess Benedikte of Denmark, the bride's sister
- Princess Caroline-Mathilde of Denmark, the bride's paternal aunt by marriage and first cousin once removed
  - Princess Elisabeth of Denmark, the bride's first cousin
  - Prince Ingolf of Denmark, the bride's first cousin
  - Prince Christian of Denmark, the bride’s first cousin
- (Denmark) Prince Viggo, Count of Rosenborg, and Princess Viggo, Countess of Rosenborg, the bride's first cousin twice removed and his wife
- Princess René of Bourbon-Parma, the bride's first cousin twice removed
- Princess Axel of Denmark, the bride's first cousin once removed (also widow of the bride's first cousin twice removed)
  - Prince and Princess Georg of Denmark, the bride's second cousin and his wife

==== House of Bernadotte ====
- The King of Sweden, the bride's maternal grandfather
  - The Duke of Västerbotten's family:
    - (Sweden) Princess Birgitta and Prince Johann Georg of Hohenzollern, the bride's first cousin and her husband
    - Princess Christina of Sweden, the bride's first cousin
    - The Crown Prince of Sweden, the bride's first cousin
  - Count Sigvard Bernadotte of Wisborg's family:
    - Count Michael Bernadotte of Wisborg, the bride's first cousin

=== Relatives of the groom ===
==== House of Glücksburg ====
- Queen Frederica of Greece, the groom's mother
  - Princess Sofia and Prince Juan Carlos of Spain, the groom's sister and brother-in-law
  - Princess Irene of Greece and Denmark, the groom's sister
- Queen Mother Helen of Romania, the groom's paternal aunt
  - Queen Anne of Romania, the bride and groom's mutual second cousin once removed
    - Princess Margareta of Romania, the groom's paternal first cousin once removed
- Princess Irene, Duchess of Aosta, the groom's paternal aunt
  - The Duke and Duchess of Aosta, the groom's paternal first cousin and his wife
- Lady Katherine and Major Richard Brandram, the groom's paternal aunt and uncle
- Crown Prince Alexander of Yugoslavia, the groom's paternal first cousin once removed
- The Princess Eugénie, Duchess of Castel Duino and Duke of Castel Duino, the groom's first cousin once removed, and her husband
  - Princess Tatiana Radziwiłł, the groom's second cousin
  - Prince Jerzy Radziwiłł, the groom's second cousin
- Princess Paul of Yugoslavia, the groom's paternal first cousin once removed
- The Count of Törring-Jettenbach, widow of the groom's paternal first cousin once removed
- (United Kingdom) Princess Marina, Duchess of Kent, the groom's paternal first cousin once removed, and the bride's paternal second cousin once removed
  - (United Kingdom) Princess Alexandra, The Hon. Mrs Angus Ogilvy, and The Hon. Angus Ogilvy, the groom's paternal second cousin (also the bride and groom's mutual third cousin) and her husband
  - (United Kingdom) Prince Michael of Kent, the groom's paternal second cousin (also the bride and groom's mutual third cousin)
- Princess Paul Aleksandrovich Chavchavadze, the groom's first cousin once removed
- Princess Andrew of Greece and Denmark, the groom's paternal grandaunt by marriage
  - The Dowager Princess of Hohenlohe-Langenburg, the groom's first cousin once removed
    - The Prince of Hohenlohe-Langenburg, the groom's second cousin
  - The Dowager Margravine of Baden, the groom's first cousin once removed
    - Princess Margarita and Prince Tomislav of Yugoslavia, the groom's second cousin and her husband
    - The Margrave of Baden, the groom's second cousin
    - Prince Ludwig of Baden, the groom's second cousin
  - The Duke of Edinburgh, the groom's paternal first cousin once removed (representing the Queen of the United Kingdom)
    - (United Kingdom) The Prince of Wales, the groom's paternal second cousin
    - Princess Anne of the United Kingdom, the groom's paternal second cousin
- Prince Michael of Greece and Denmark, the groom's paternal first cousin once removed

==== House of Hanover ====
- The Duchess of Brunswick, the groom's maternal grandmother
  - Prince and Princess George William of Hanover, the groom's maternal uncle and aunt (and the groom's first cousin, once removed and her husband)
    - Prince Karl of Hesse-Kassel, the groom's second cousin
    - Princess Clarissa of Hesse-Kassel, the groom's second cousin
    - Prince Welf Ernst of Hanover, the groom's first cousin

=== Other royal guests ===
==== Members of reigning royal houses ====
- (Belgium) The King and Queen of the Belgians, the bride's second cousin and his wife
- The King and Princess Muna Al Hussein of Jordan
- The Prince and Princess of Liechtenstein
- The Hereditary Grand Duke and Hereditary Grand Duchess of Luxembourg, the bride's second cousin and her husband (representing The Grand Duchess of Luxembourg)
- The Prince and Princess of Monaco
- Prince Moulay Ali of Morocco (representing the King of Morocco)
- The Queen and Prince Consort of the Netherlands, the bride's first cousin twice removed, and her husband
  - Princess Beatrix of the Netherlands, the bride's second cousin once removed
- The King of Norway, the bride's paternal first cousin once removed
  - The Crown Prince of Norway, the bride's paternal second cousin
- The King and Queen of Thailand
- (United Kingdom) Prince Richard of Gloucester, the bride and groom's mutual third cousin
- (United Kingdom) The Earl Mountbatten of Burma, the bride and groom's mutual second cousin once removed

==== Members of non-reigning royal houses ====
- The Count and Countess of Barcelona, the bride and groom's mutual second cousin once removed, and his wife (also parents of the groom's brother-in-law)
  - Infanta Pilar of Spain, the bride and groom's mutual third cousin (also sister-in-law of the groom's sister)
  - Infanta Cristina of Spain, the bride and groom's mutual second cousin once removed
  - Infanta Beatriz of Spain, the bride and groom's mutual second cousin once removed
- Prince Franz of Bavaria
- Prince Max Emanuel of Bavaria
- The Duke and Duchess of Braganza
- Tsar Simeon II and Tsarista Margarita of Bulgaria, the bride and groom's mutual fourth cousin once removed, and his wife
- The Duke of Calabria
- Queen Farida of Egypt
  - Princess Ferial of Egypt
  - Princess Fawzia Farouk of Egypt
  - Princess Fadia of Egypt
- The Duke of Galliera
- The Landgrave of Hesse
  - Prince Moritz of Hesse-Kassel
- Prince Wolfgang of Hesse-Kassel
- King Umberto II and Queen Marie-José of Italy, the bride and groom's mutual third cousin twice removed
  - The Prince of Naples, the bride and groom's mutual fourth cousin once removed
  - Princess Maria Gabriella of Savoy, the bride and groom's mutual fourth cousin once removed
  - Princess Maria Beatrice of Savoy, the bride and groom's mutual fourth cousin once removed
- Princess Chantal of France
- Duke and Duchess Christian Louis of Mecklenburg
- The Duke of Parma
- The Prince and Princess of Prussia, the groom's maternal first cousin once removed, and his wife (also the bride's paternal first cousin once removed)
- The Duke and Duchess of Württemberg
  - Duke Carl of Württemberg
- The Duke of Bourbon and Burgundy, the bride and groom's mutual third cousin

=== Other notable guests ===
- Lynda Bird Johnson
