= Sorgenfri Palace =

Coordinates: 55°46′44″N 12°29′49″E

- Sorgenfri Slot
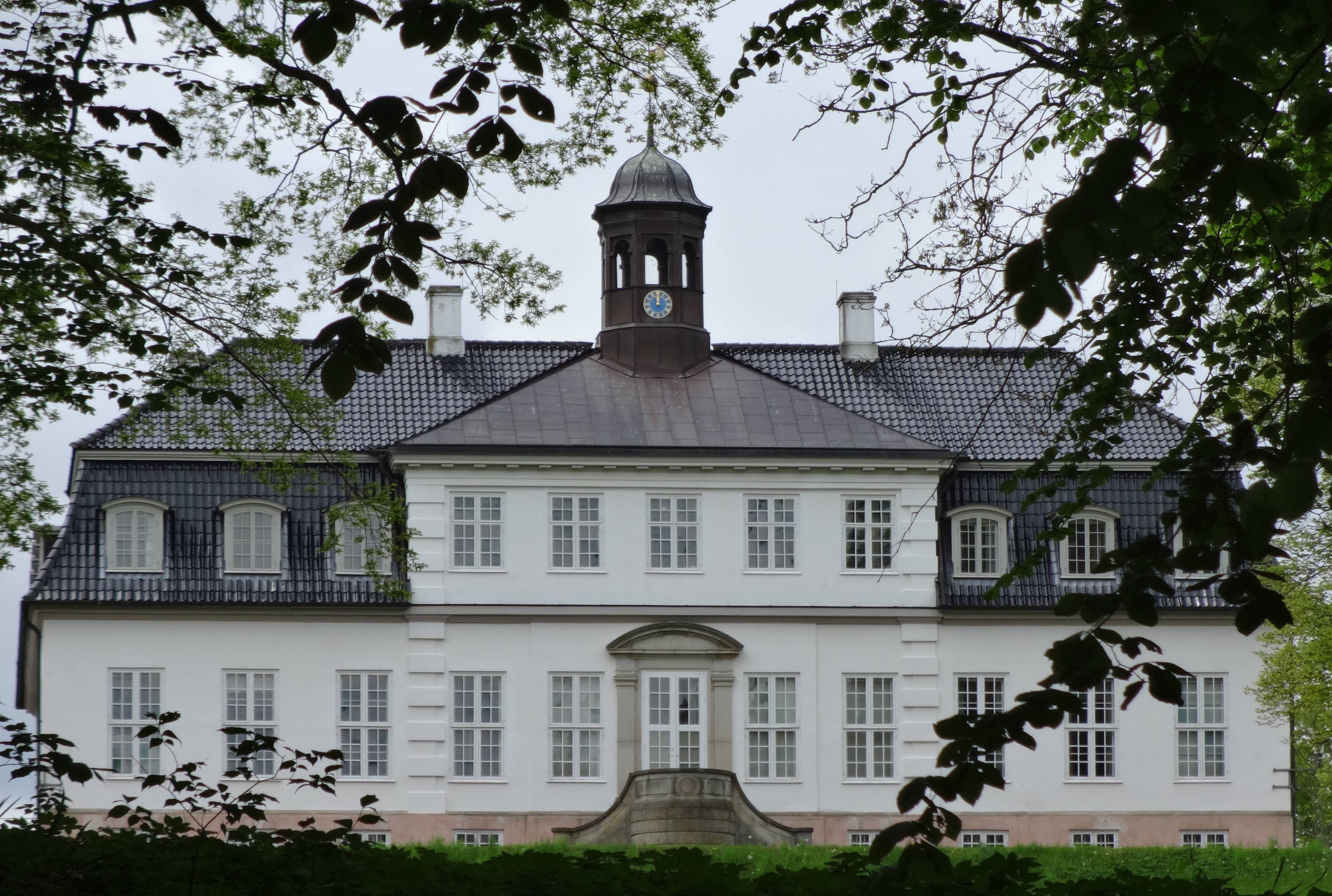
- Sorgenfri Palace
- Interactive map of the Sorgenfri Palace area

General information
- Type: Palace
- Architectural style: Baroque
- Location: Kongens Lyngby, Denmark
- Construction started: 1756
- Completed: 1757
- Client: Dowager Princess Sophie Caroline of East Frisia

Design and construction
- Architect: Lauritz de Thurah

Sorgenfri Palace (Danish: Sorgenfri Slot; lit. 'Sorrow free', a calque of Sans Souci) is a royal residence of the Danish monarch, located in Lyngby-Taarbæk Municipality, on the east side of Lyngby Kongevej, in the northern suburbs of Copenhagen. The surrounding neighbourhood is called Sorgenfri after it. Only the cellar and foundations survive of the first Sorgenfri House, which was built in 1705 to design by François Dieussart. The current house was built in 1756 by Lauritz de Thurah and later adapted and extended by Peter Meyn in the 1790s. Lauritz de Thurah has also designed buildings which flank the driveway closer to the road.

Sorgenfri Palace is surrounded by a large park which is bounded by Mølleåen to the east. It was adapted to the English Romantic style in the late 1790s and early 1899s and contains several small buildings.

Christian X used it as a summer residence and it has later been part of it let out to relatives of the royal family. The park is open to the public.

== History ==
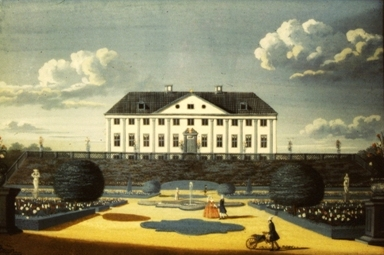
Sorgenfri in 1742

Sorgenfri Palace is located at the site of a medieval settlement, Mølletorp, which was owned by the Bishopric of Roskilde but confiscated by the crown during the Reformation in the 1530s. In 1686, it was replaced by a country house by High Court Justice Michael Vibe.

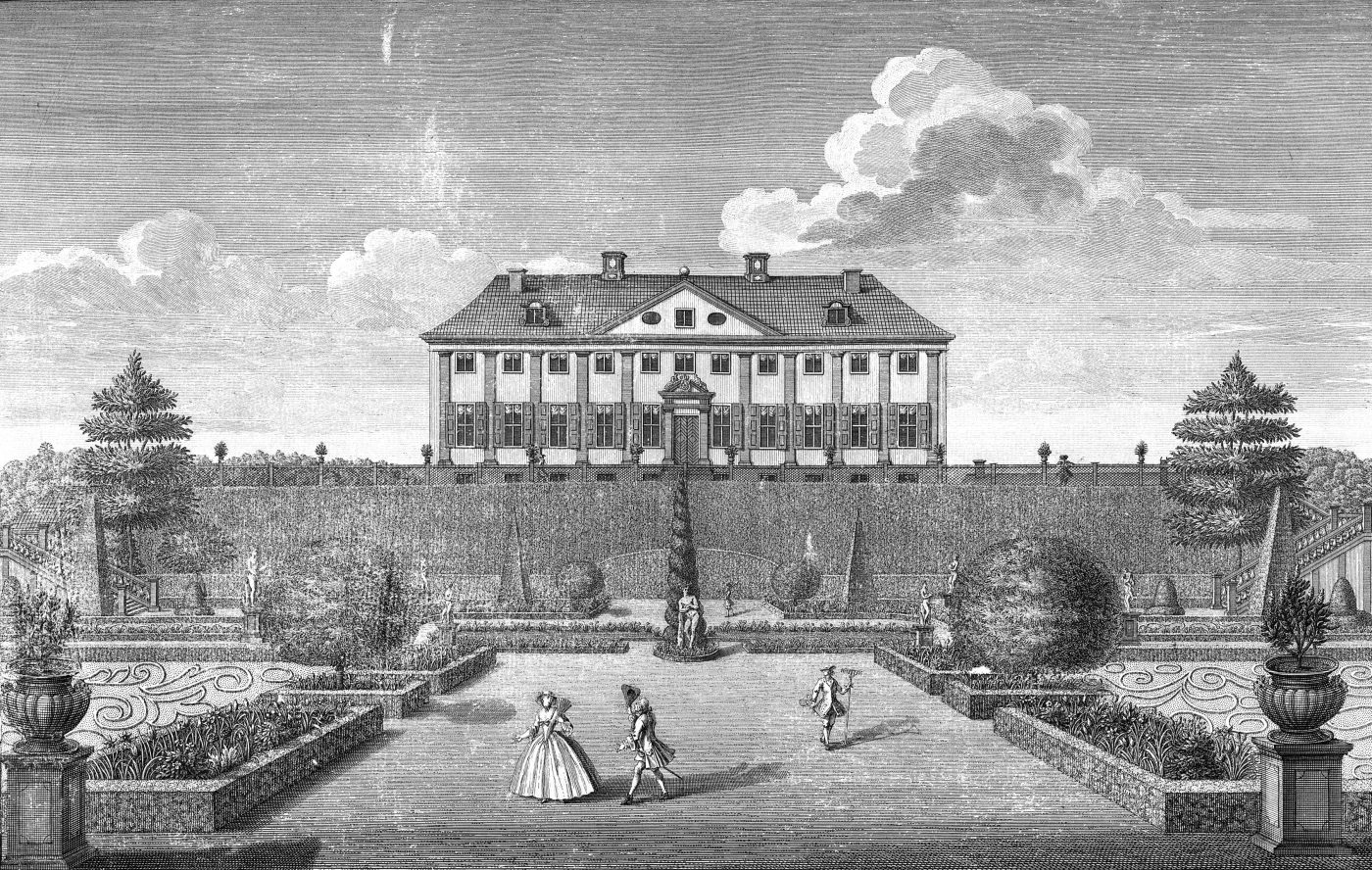
Sorgenfri in Lauritz de Thurah's Den Danske Vitruvius

Count Carl von Ahlefeldt acquired the estate in 1702. He commissioned the architect François Dieussart to build a new summer residence at the site and renamed it Sorgenfri. The building, a half-timbered, three-winged complex in Baroque style, was completed in 1705. The central wing contained a banquet hall with double high ceilings. Passage between the two residential side wings was therefore only possible at the ground floor.

King Christian VI acquired the estate in 1730. His son, Crown Prince Frederick, the later King Frederick V, used it as summer residence from 1742. The building was refurbished by Lauritz de Thurah who also constructed new stables and a new wing for the gentlemen of the Court.

After his ascend to the throne in 1747, Frederick V gave the property to his aunt, Sophie Caroline, Dowager Princess of East Frisia. She demolished it and charged Lauritzde Thurah with the construction of a new house on the foundations of the old one.

Sophie Caroline died in 1764. In 1766, Sorgenfri was ceded to the 12-year-old Prince Frederick, the half-brother of Christian VII of Denmark. In 1769, he sold the property to Jean Henri Desmercières. The next owner was the merchant and shipowner Henrik Bolten, whose trading house was based in the Boltens Gård in Copenhagen. He went bankrupt in the late 1780s and Sorgenfri was then reacquired by Prince Frederick in 1789. He charged Peter Meyn with adapting and expanding the house.

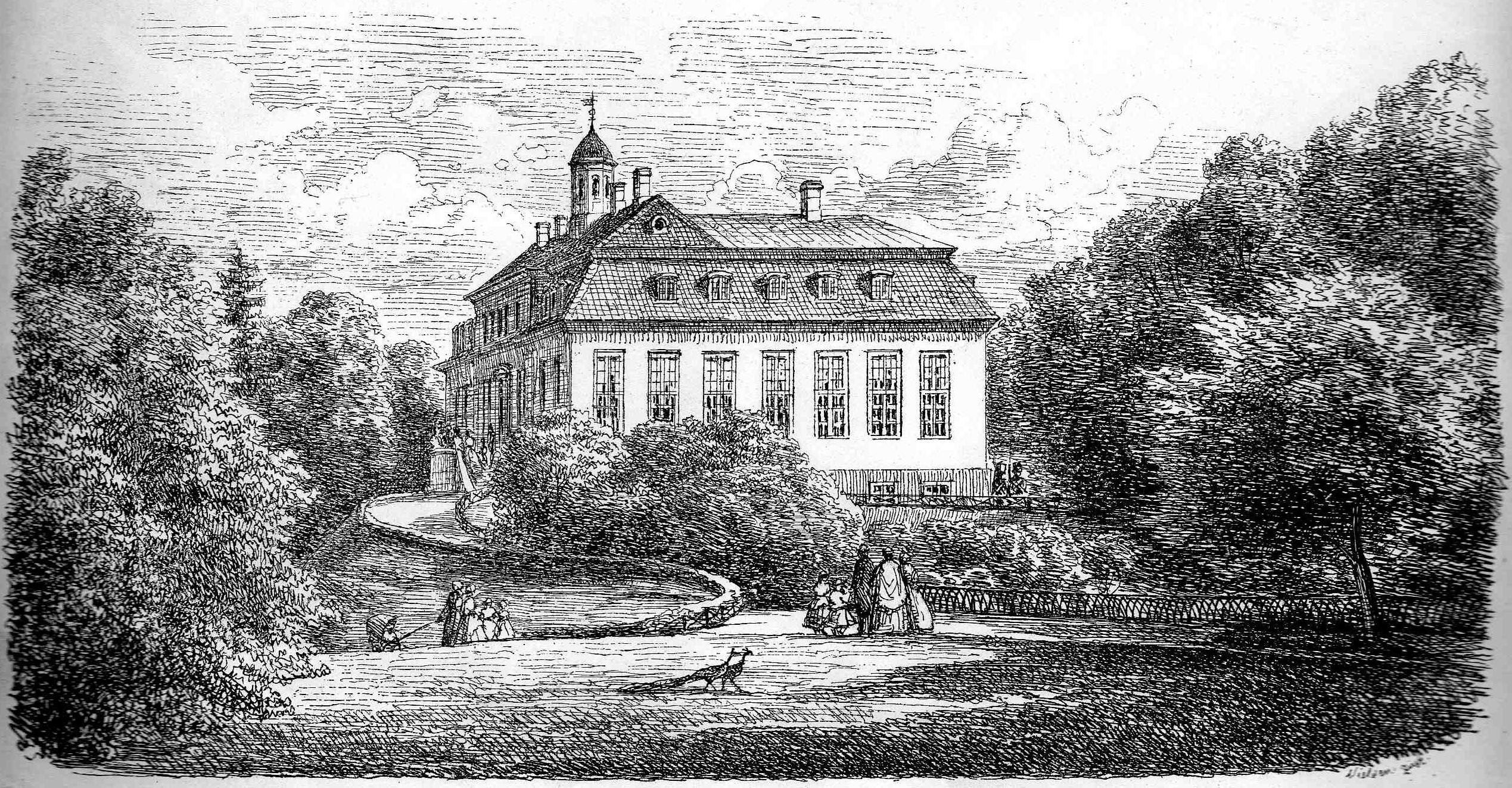
Sorgenfri in 1865

When Crown Prince Frederik died in 1805, Sorgenfri was passed on to his son, the later King Christian VIII, who used it as a summer residence. After his death in 1848, Dowager Queen Caroline Amalie spent all her summers at the estate until her death in 1881.

Frederik VII had ceded Sorgenfri to the state in 1856 and after 1881 it was left empty for years. In 1898, it was ceded to Prince Christian, later King Christian X as summer residence. King Christian X and Queen Alexandrine continued to live at Sorgenfri in the summer time and the king was often seen riding in the neighborhood.

Prince Knud married Princess Caroline-Mathilde in 1933. During the Second World War, the royal family, was staying at the Palace. On 29 August 1943, the Germans launched Operation Safari, where under the command of Lieutenant General Eduard Ritter von Schleich, they attacked the palace, resulting in a firefight and the death of seven Germans. Prince Knud and Princess Caroline-Mathilde continued to live in Kavalerfløjen until Christian X's death in 1947 and then moved into the main building. The main building was once again left empty with Princess Caroline-Mathilde's death in 1995.

From 1991, Count Christian of Rosenborg, a first cousin of Margrethe II, and Countess Anne Dorte lived in a detached wing of the palace called Damebygningen until they died in 2013 and 2014, respectively.

== Architecture ==
Sorgenfri Palace is designed in the Neoclassical style. The roof is topped by a cupola dating from the renovation in 1791–94.

== Palace garden ==
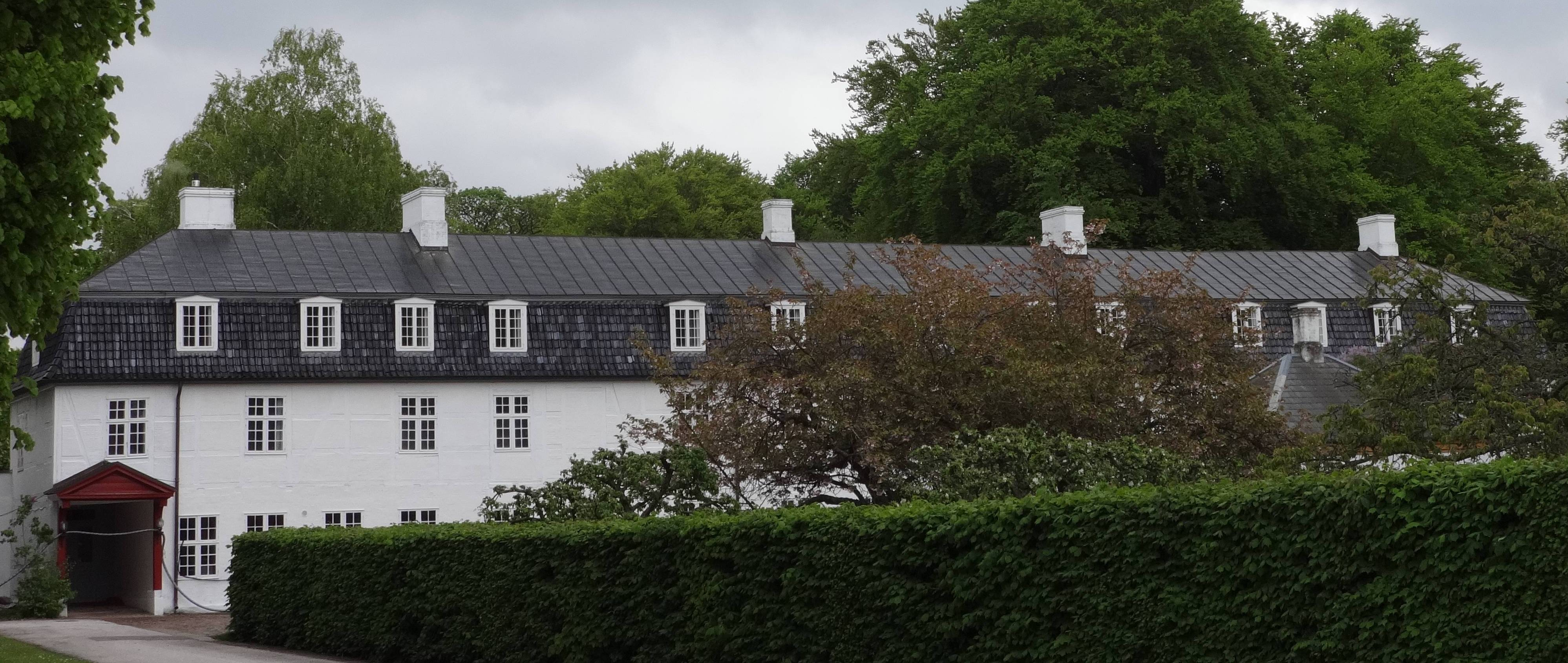
The classical wing Damebygningen, Sorgenfri Palace, 2014

The palace is located in a 40 hectares (99 acres) garden, which was originally made in Baroque style in 1706. Prince Frederick had this changed to an English landscape garden style between 1791 and 1794. The line of lime trees in front of the palace is still a trace of the baroque style garden.

Architect Nicolai Abildgaard was responsible for the garden pavilions The Swiss House and The Norwegian House.

The Mølleåen river runs through the park on the east side.

A memorial bench for poet Viggo Stuckenberg and a memorial stone for women's rights activist Gyrithe Lemche are also located in the park.

== Park ==
The park covers a large area on both sides of Lyngby Kongevej. It contains several listed buildings.

Woodland and a garden surround the castle. A French-style garden with symmetry, topiary shrubs and ornamental vases was created in the 18th century. Crown Prince Frederik adapted it in the English style with winding paths and romantic garden furniture such as a well, a grotto and gazebos. The latter, the Norwegian House and the Swiss House, were designed by Nicolai Abildgaard.
