= Holger Blom =

Danish fashion designer (1905–1965)

Holger Blom (12 August 1905 – 19 March 1965) was a Danish fashion designer. He is best known for his film and theatre costumes and his creations for the Danish royal family.

== Biography ==
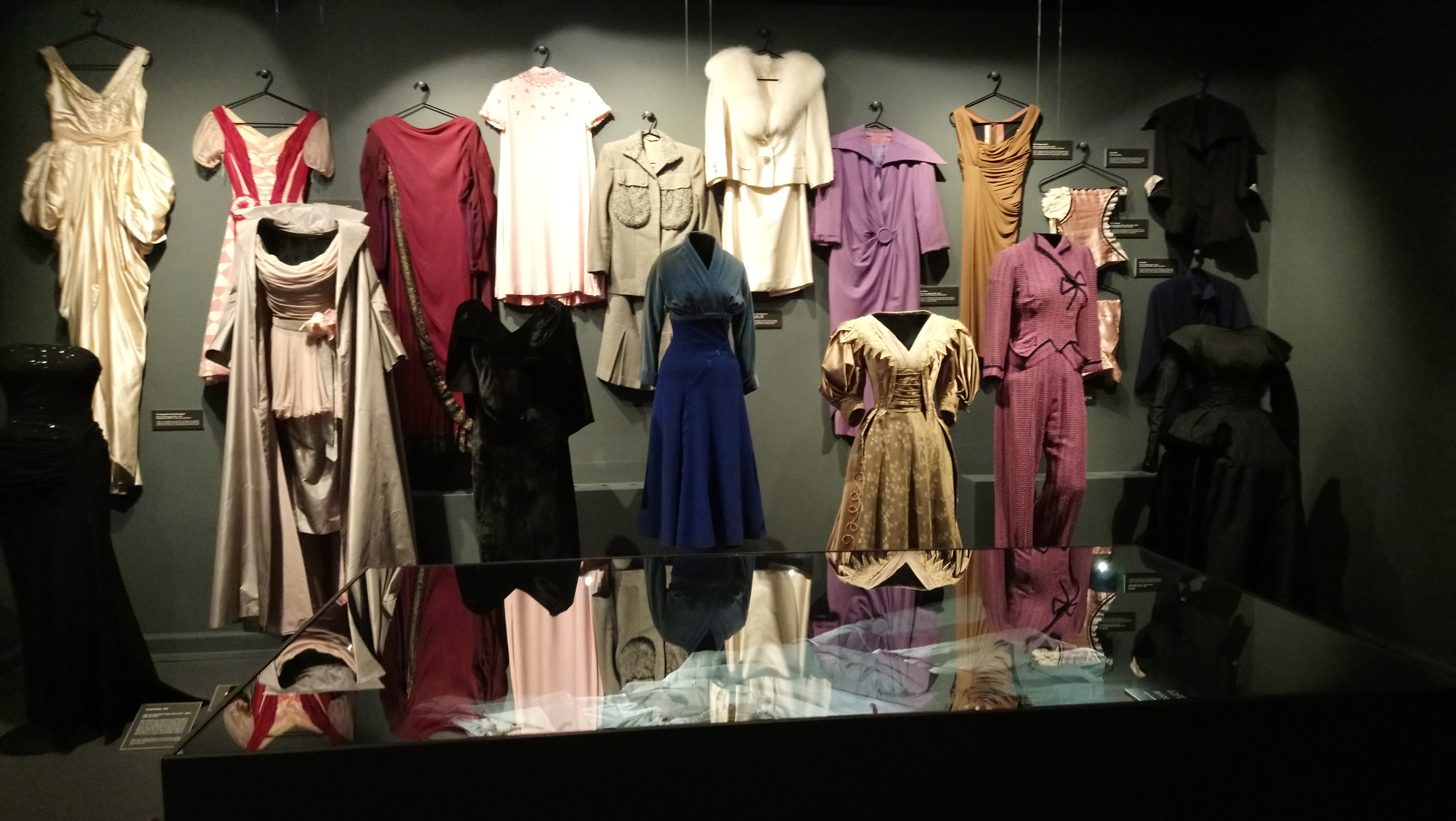
Dresses by Blom on display in Skanderborg

Blom was born on 12 August 1905 in Skanderborg, Denmark. He was born into a wealthy manufacturing family. He was the son of manufacturer Christian Blom (1866-1929) and his wife, Julie Blom (1878-1921). He was educated at Odense Cathedral School in Odense and studied German at the University of Copenhagen. He began to sew dresses for ladies in Copenhagen during his studies. He left university and opened his atelier in 1929.

Blom is best known as a dressmaker to the Danish royal family, namely Queen Ingrid. In 1964, he designed Princess Anne-Marie's gown for her wedding to Constantine II, King of the Hellenes.

Blom's other clientele included Bodil Kjær, Marguerite Viby, Helle Virkner and Liva Weel. He designed costumes for the Royal Danish Theatre and the films Meet Me on Cassiopeia, Den kære familie and Kispus.

On 19 March 1965, Blom died at the age of 59. He was unmarried. Queen Ingrid had visited him on the day of his death. Blom's apprentice Jørgen Bender became the royal family's primary dressmaker. Blom was the inspiration for the character Daniel Andersen-Skjern in the TV series Matador.

== Gallery ==
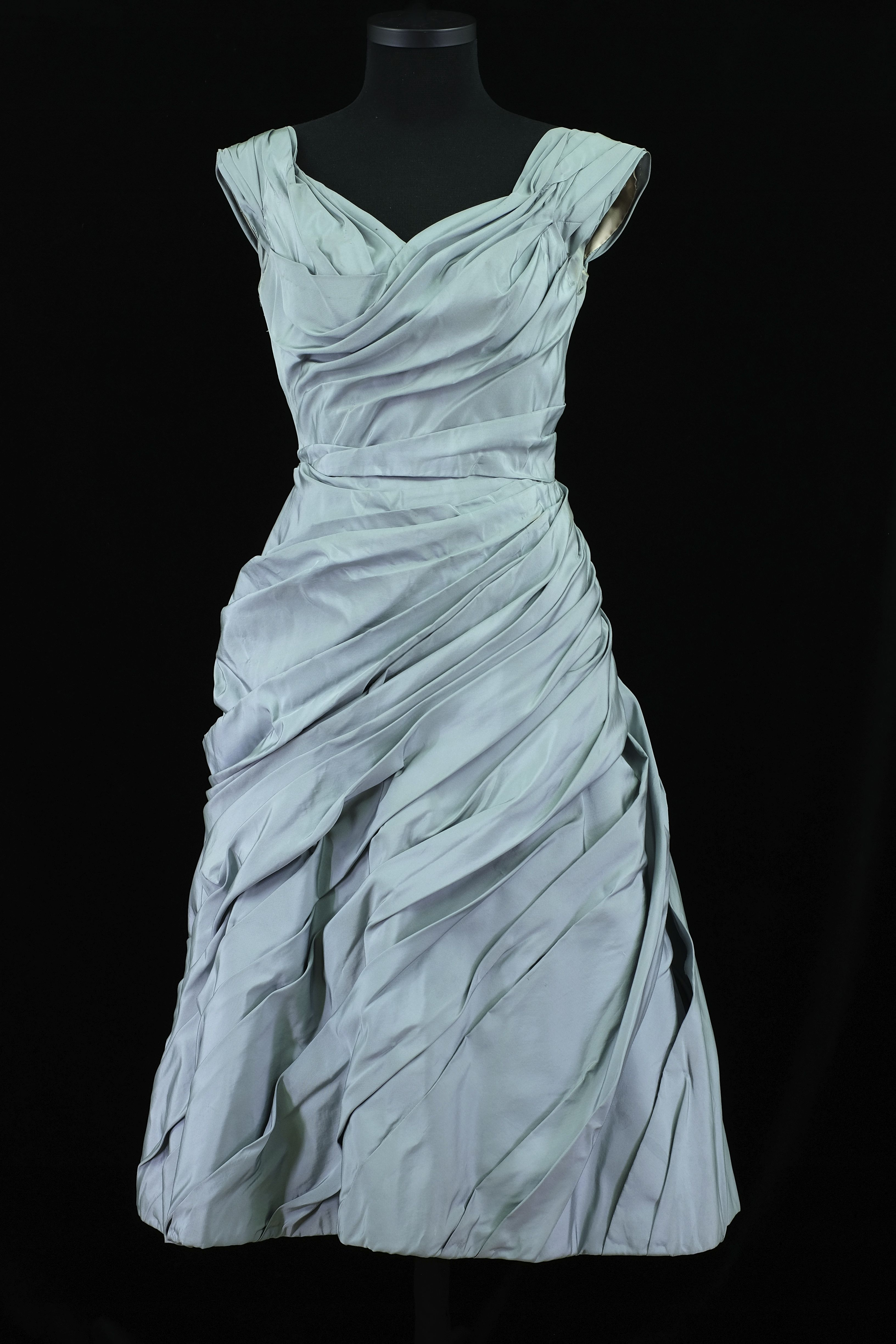
Dress designed by Blom for the Royal Danish Theatre

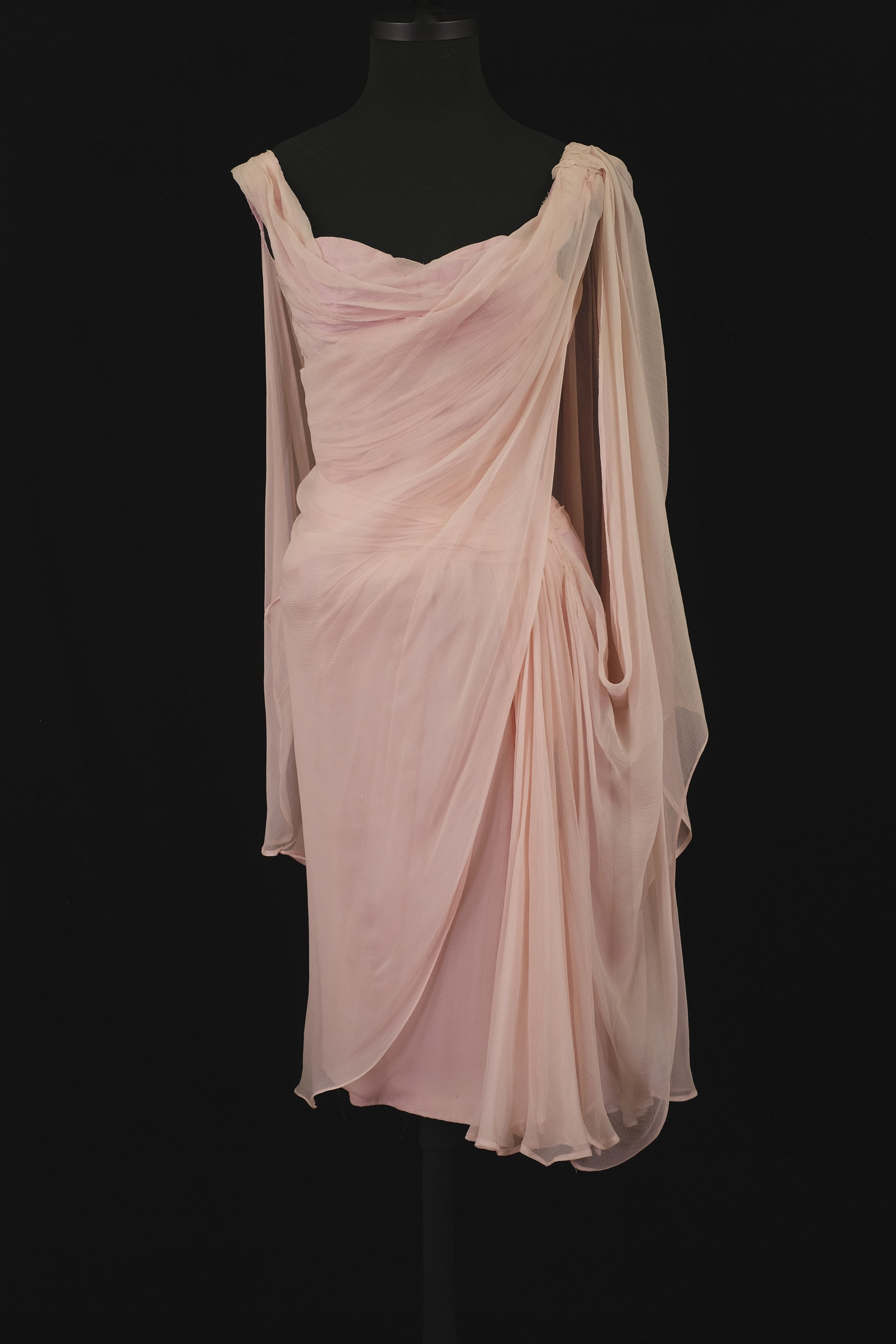
Dress designed by Blom for the Royal Danish Theatre

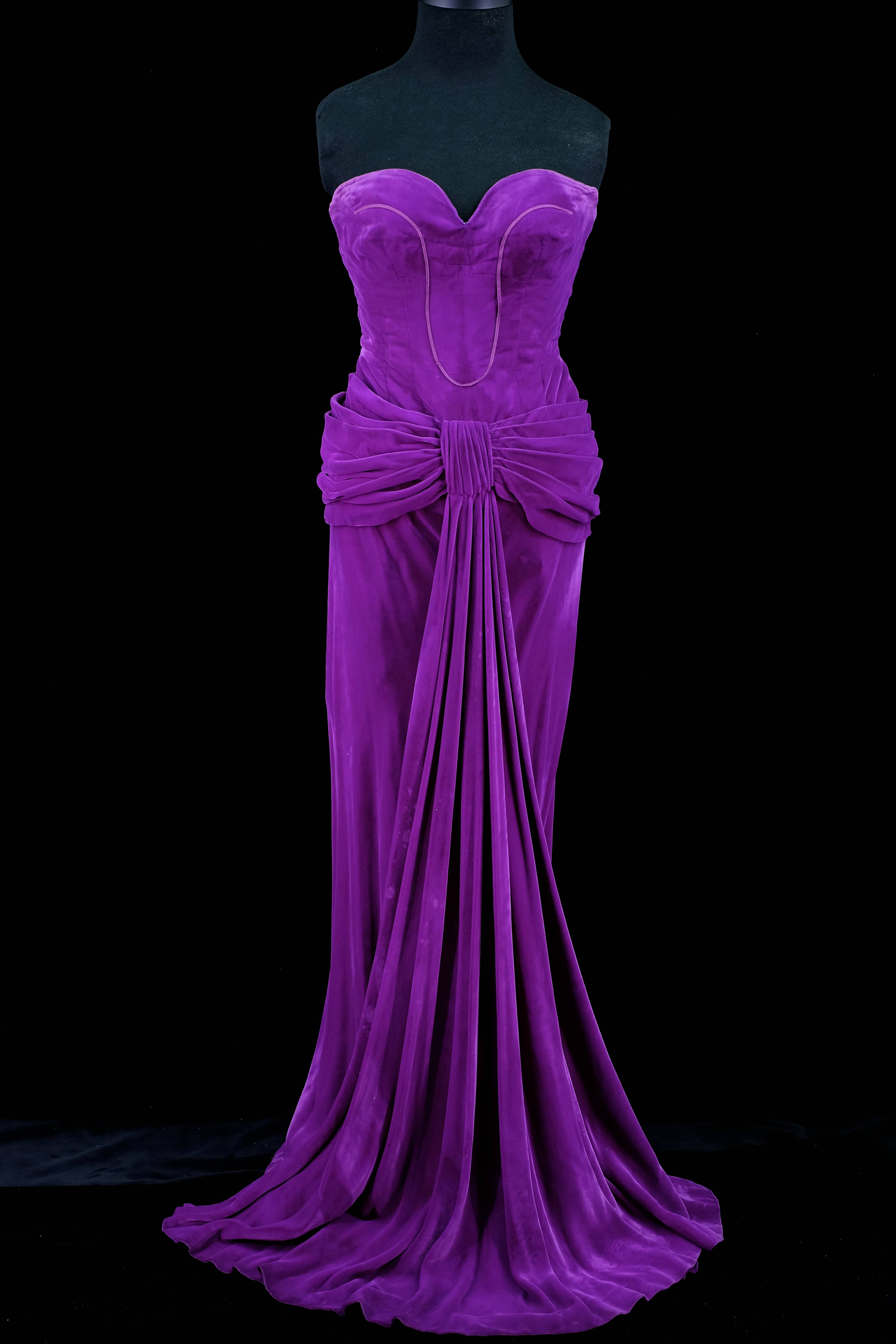
Dress designed by Blom for the Royal Danish Theatre
