= Countess Anne Dorte of Rosenborg =

Danish countess (1947–2014)

Countess Anne Dorte
- Born: Anne Dorte Maltoft-Nielsen; 3 October 1947; Frederikssund, Denmark
- Died: 2 January 2014 (aged 66); Gentofte Hospital, Copenhagen, Denmark
- Spouse: Count Christian of Rosenborg (m. 1971; died 2013)
- Issue: Countess Josephine; Countess Camilla; Countess Feodora
Names
- Anne Dorte
- Father: Villy Edgar Vilhelm Maltoft-Nielsen
- Mother: Bodil Marie Elisabet Maltoft

Countess Anne Dorte of Rosenborg (née Anne Dorte Maltoft-Nielsen; 3 October 1947 – 2 January 2014) was a Danish countess. She was the wife of Count Christian of Rosenborg, the grandson of King Christian X of Denmark. Prince Christian had to give up his princely rank in order to marry her because she was a commoner. The couple married in Kongens Lyngby Kirke, Kongens Lyngby, on 7 February 1971, earning her the title Her Excellency Countess Anne Dorte of Rosenborg. She was daughter of Villy Edgaard VIlhelm Nielsen, Procurator, and wife Bodil Marie Elisabeth Maltoft.

Since 1991, Anne Dorte and Christian of Rosenborg resided in a detached classical wing of the royal palace Sorgenfri in Lyngby near Copenhagen.

== Public life ==
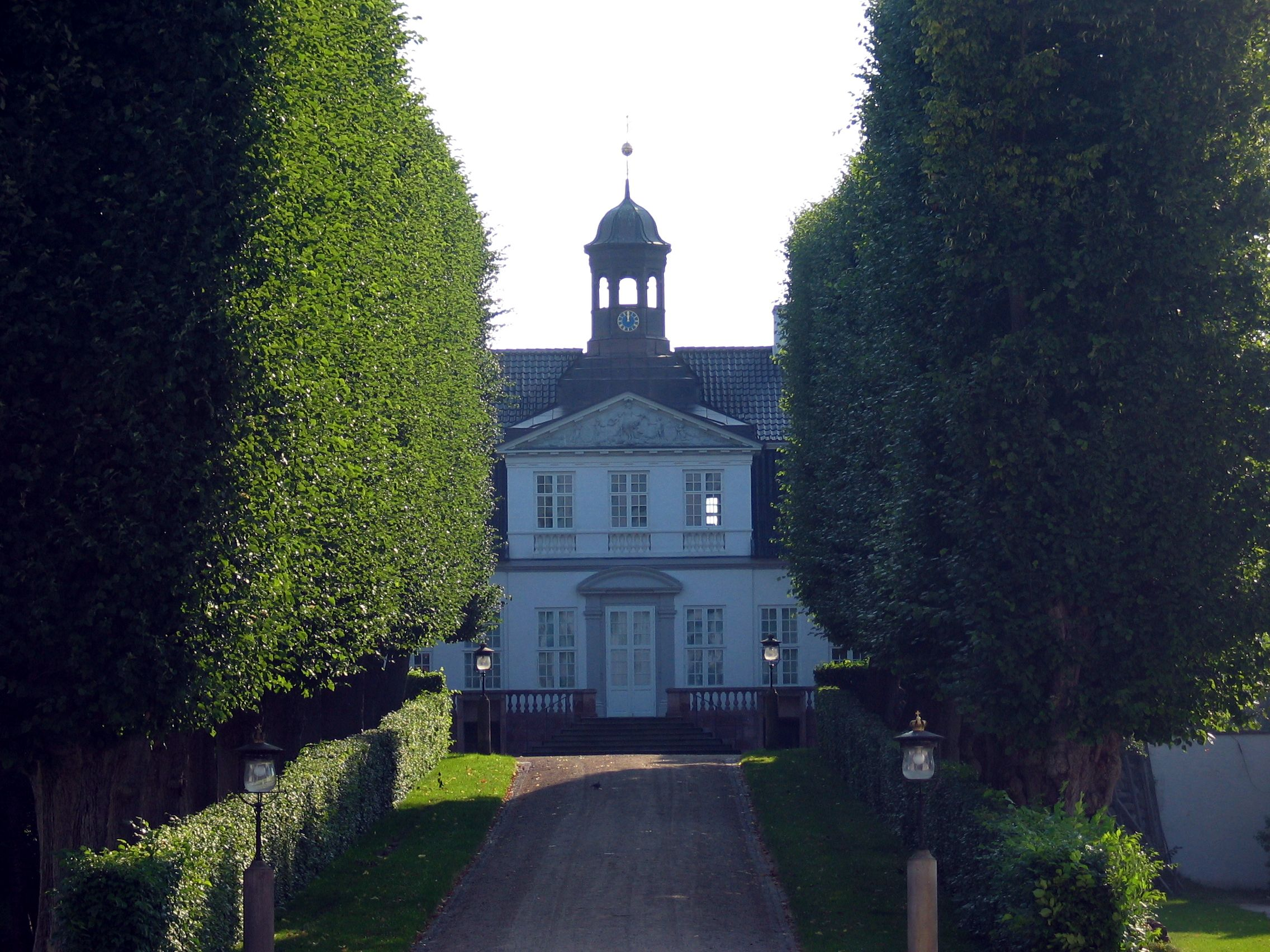
Sorgenfri Palace

Countess Anne Dorte often took part in major public events associated with the Danish royal family, such as the wedding of Crown Prince Frederik at the Church of Our Lady in Copenhagen, and the subsequent reception at Fredensborg Palace. To the broad public, Anne Dorte was known from tabloids and other media, which covered her public appearances. In interviews, Anne Dorte talked about her life in the Danish royal family and about living at Sorgenfri Palace. Thereby she often gave proof of her charming personality and her quick-wittedness: when Anne Dorte, whose father was an employee at a department store, once was asked by a journalist whether her own family background could be compared to her husband's at all, she answered with a touch of humor: "Oh yes, our families had exactly the same Christmas decorations! Those items were passed down to us from both sides, and now we cannot tell anymore what was on which Christmas tree." In a documentary by the Danish broadcasting company TV3 on the topic of dissimilar couples, Anne Dorte and her husband were interviewed. On this occasion, Count Christian assured the interviewer that he took the loss of his princely rank due to his marriage with equanimity.

Count Christian and Countess Anne Dorte had three daughters: Countess Josephine (born in 1972), Countess Camilla (born in 1972), and Countess Feodora (born in 1975).

== Death ==
Countess Anne Dorte outlived her husband by only seven months. She was admitted to Gentofte Hospital shortly after Christmas 2013 suffering from throat cancer and respiratory ailments. She died at the hospital in Copenhagen on 2 January 2014, at the age of 66. She was survived by her three daughters, Josephine, Camilla and Feodora, and seven grandchildren. Her funeral was held at the Lyngby Kirke on 9 January 2014. The funeral was, among others, attended by Queen Margrethe II, Princess Elisabeth of Denmark, celebrity hairdresser Tage Hansen and entertainer Johnny Reimar.

== Bibliography ==
- Bramsen, Bo (1992). Huset Glücksborg. Europas svigerfader og hans efterslægt [The House of Glücksburg. The Father-in-law of Europe and his descendants] (in Danish) (2nd ed.). Copenhagen: Forlaget Forum. ISBN 87-553-1843-6.
