= Jørgen Bender =

Danish fashion designer (1938–1999)

Jørgen Bender R. (9 May 1938 – 10 September 1999) was a Danish fashion designer best known for his work for the Danish, Swedish and Norwegian royal families.

== Life ==
Bender, born in Copenhagen on 9 May 1938, had wanted to be a designer since the age of 14. He apprenticed with the Danish famed designer Holger Blom, and after Blom's death in 1965, took over his atelier.

In the 1960s, after Blom's death, Queen Ingrid became a client. He designed wedding gowns for two of her daughters; Princess Margrethe (later Queen Margrethe II) for her 1967 wedding to Henri de Laborde de Monpezat, and Princess Benedikte for her 1968 wedding to Prince Richard of Sayn-Wittgenstein-Berleburg. While still working under Blom, he assisted with Princess Anne-Marie's gown for her 1964 wedding to King Constantine II of Greece. He would later design wedding gowns for Ingrid's future granddaughter-in-law, Alexandra Manley, for her 1995 wedding to Prince Joachim, and granddaughter, Princess Alexandra of Sayn-Wittgenstein-Berleburg, for her 1998 wedding to Count Jefferson von Pfeil und Klein-Ellguth.

Queen Margrethe II, herself a costume designer, often worked closely with Bender on designs. Notable creations he made for her include: a purple tulle off-the-shoulder gown for her silver wedding anniversary celebrations in 1992; a gown and fur-trimmed evening coat for Prince Joachim's wedding in 1995 (for which interior design firm Rubelli made the fabric); the fur-trimmed blue ensemble she wears each year to the New Years' Court Reception; and her iconic floral raincoat he fashioned out of a wax tablecloth she purchased at Peter Jones in London.

Bender also designed the costumes for the 1967 film Far laver sovsen (English: Father makes the sauce).

In the 1980s, Queen Ingrid introduced Bender to her niece-by-marriage, Queen Silvia of Sweden, who often wore his creations to the annual Nobel Banquet. He also designed for Queen Sonja of Norway.

In 1998 he designed an evening gown for the Queen of Denmark which she wore for the sitting of her formal portrait by Niels Strøbek.

In 1997, Bender was made a Knight of the Order of the Dannebrog. He died on 10 September 1999 at the age of 61.

== Gallery ==
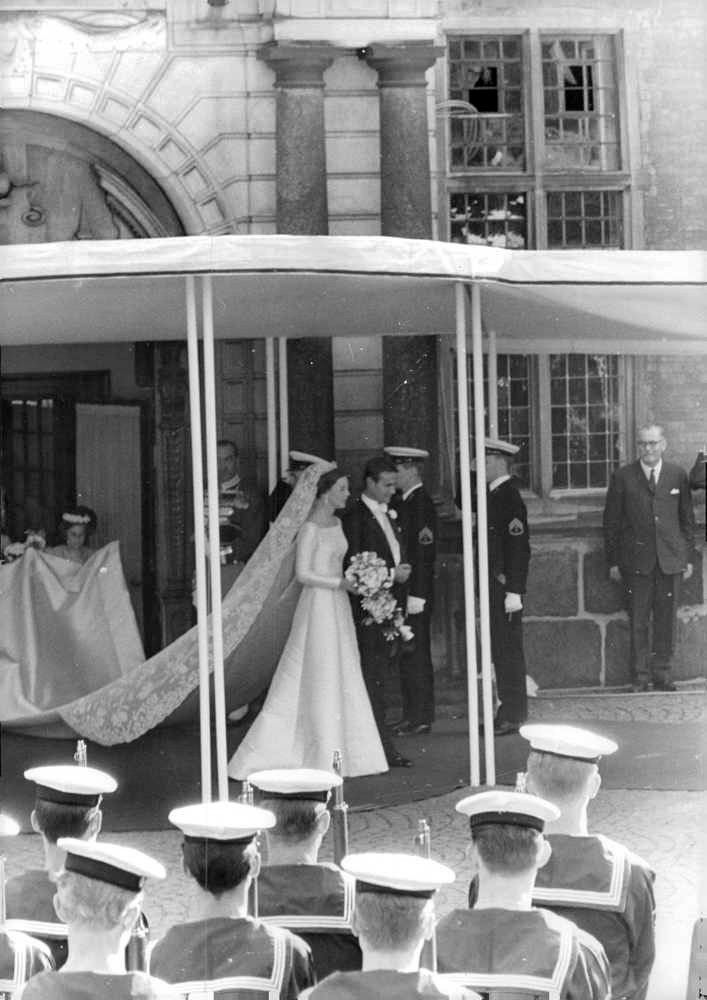
Then-Princess Margrethe in her wedding gown, a Bender creation, 1967

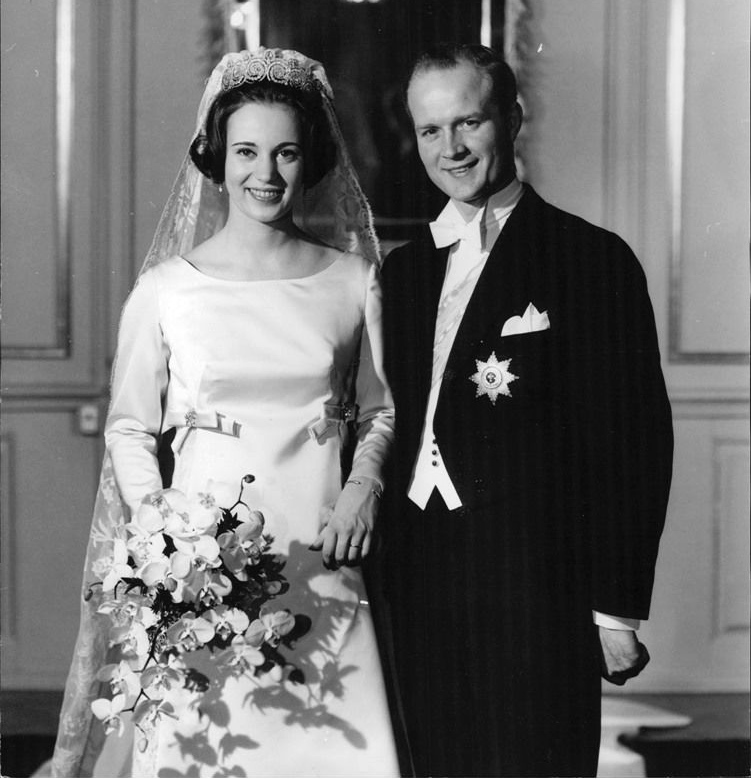
Princess Benedikte in her wedding gown, a Bender creation, 1968

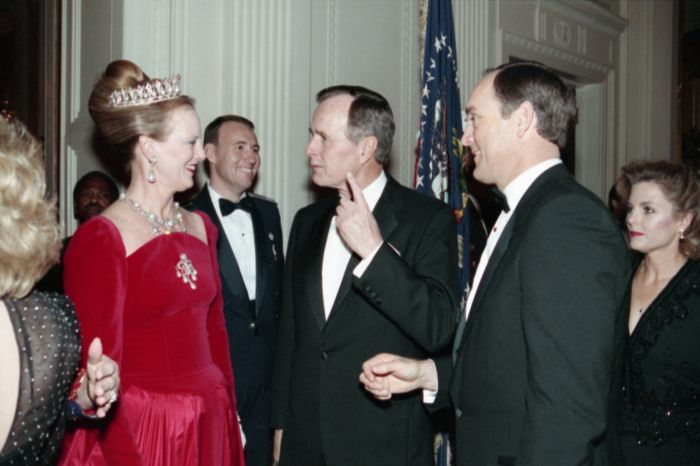
Queen Margrethe II wearing a gown by Bender on a state visit to the United States, 1991
