= Henrik Bolten =

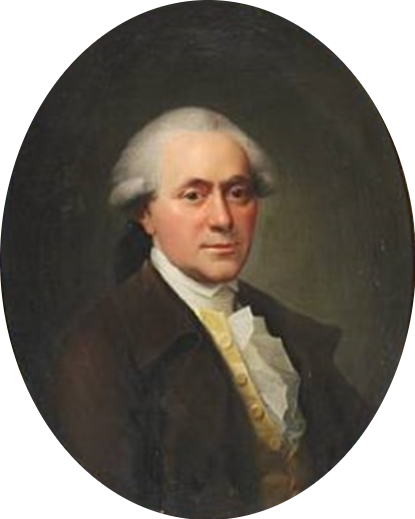
Henrik Bolten painted by Jens Juel.

Henrik Bolten (7 December 1734 – 7 March 1790) was a German-born Danish merchant. In 1785, he was created a baron under the name von Bolten. His former home in Gothersgade is still known as Baron Boltens Gård.

== Early life and career ==
Bolten was born as Heinrich Bolte on 7 December 1734 in Bremen. He was the son of coachman Johann Hinrich Bolte and Gesche Belings (Bählings). He later moved to Copenhagen where he apprenticed as a wine merchant (vintapper).

In 1763, he was admitted to the Wine Merchant's Guild (vinmtapperlauget) and he was the same year granted citizenship as a wine merchant in Copenhagen. In 1767, he was able to buy the large property known as Veltkuglen in Gothersgade. He immediately went on to construct a new building on the site.

Through his extensive trade in wines, he became involved in overseas trade, operating with his own fleet of merchant ships. He was both active in the East and West Indies trade. During the North American War of Independence, he became one of the wealthiest merchants in Copenhagen. He owned five ships.

== Baron and landowner ==
Bolten's marriage to one of Johan Friedrich Heinrich's daughters was instrumental in his aspirations to climb socially. On 19 May 1783, he was raised to the peerage with title of baron. He had prior to that donated 40,000 Danish rigsdaler to the establishment of the Fødselsstiftelsen. On 20 January 1783, he had replaced his citizenship as a wine merchant with the more prestigious citizenship of a wholesaler (grosserer). Just a few days after his ennoblement, however, as a result of the emerging financial crisis, Bolten had to stop his payments. With a loan of 700,000 rigsdaler from the state he initially managed to get his business back on track. In 1785, he bought the estate Asserstrup on Lolland and the nearby Frederiksdal. He continued his property purchases there by acquiring Sæbygård and Ågård (in Løve herred) in 1785.

== Bankruptcy and death ==
Shortly after the June term in 1785, however, Bolten ran into payment difficulties again. This time the government was unwilling to support him, resulting in his bankruptcy. All his assets were realized at great loss. Sorgenfri was sold in 1789 to Crown Prince Frederik. Bolten never recovered from the bankruptcy. He spent the last years of his life in relative poverty as a tenant in the garret of his old property in Gothersgade. He died in 1792.

Henrik Bolten divorced his wife in 1786. She was later married to Frederik Christopher Trampe til Løgismose (1779–1832). Her sister was married to the English-born sea captain and merchant John Christmas.
