= Baron Boltens Gård =

Building in Copenhagen

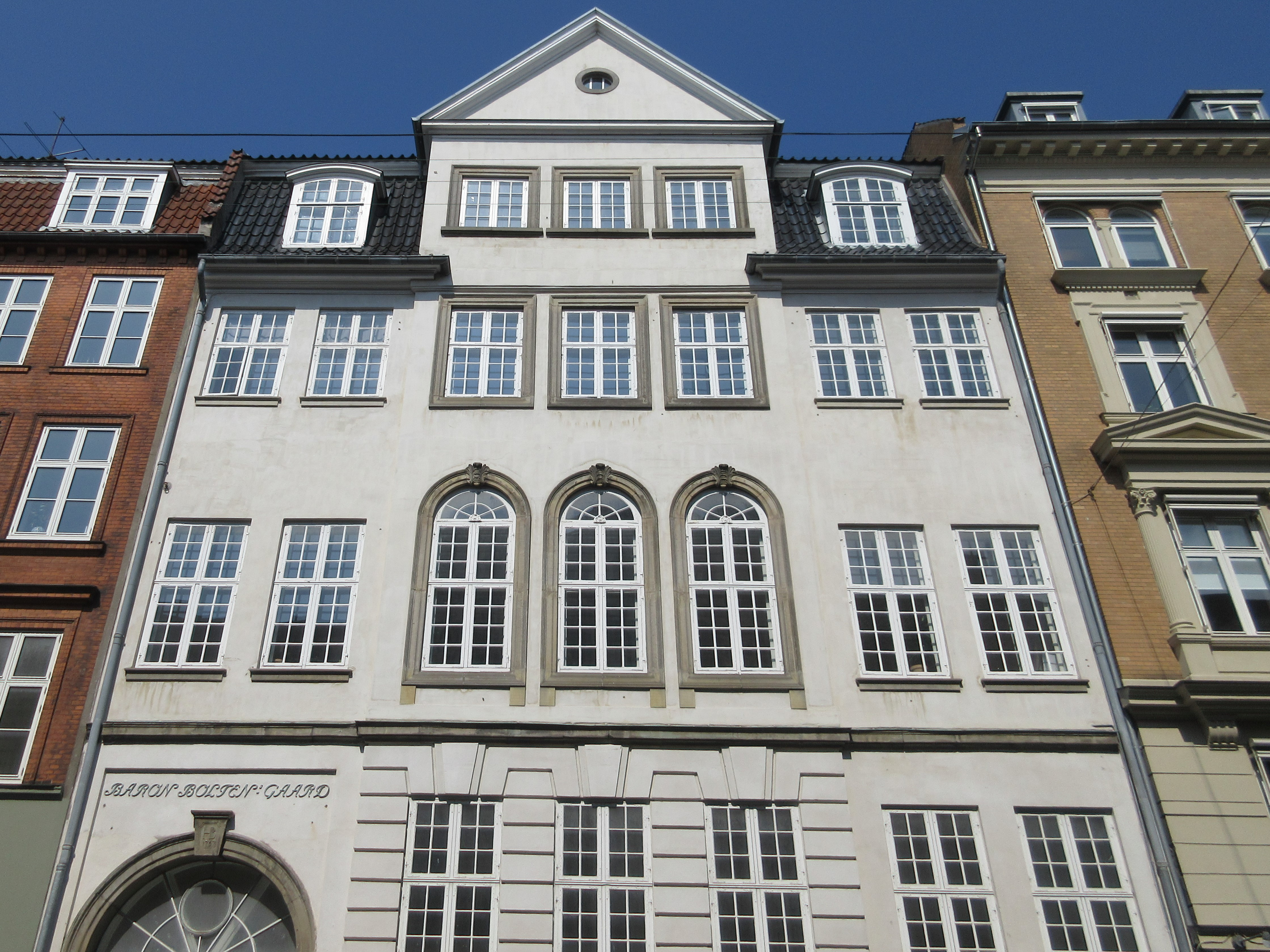
- Gothersgade 8
- Interactive map of the Baron Boltens Gård area

General information
- Architectural style: Rococo
- Location: Copenhagen, Denmark
- Coordinates: 55°40′55″N 12°35′5″E
- Completed: 1760

Baron Boltens Gård is a historic house at 8 Gothersgade in central Copenhagen, Denmark, as well as a passageway that connects Gothersgade to Store Kongensgade. In recent years the name has also referred to an entertainment cluster located at the same address.

== History ==
=== Site history, 1689–1783 ===
The property was listed in Copenhagen's first cadastre of 1689 as No. 65 in St. Ann's West Quarter (Sankt Annæ Vester Kvarter), owned by sailmaker Jens Ravn, In the new cadastre of 1756, it was listed as No. 3 in St. Ann's West Quarter. It was at that time owned by houlier Thomas Mathiesen.

The property was originally called Weltkuglen and was in the mid-18th century a focal point for international trade and a popular meeting place for prominent citizens and international merchants.

=== Bolten and the new building ===
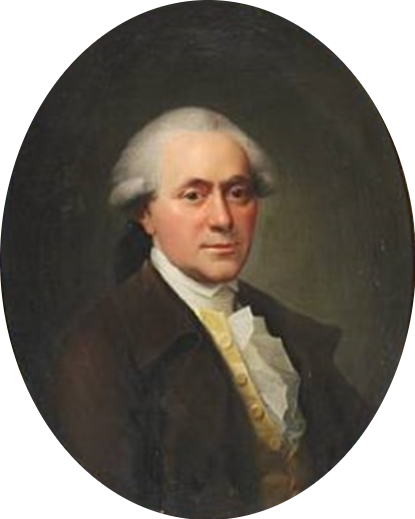
Henrik Bolten painted by Jens Juel.

In 1767 the property was acquired by an affluent wine bottler and merchant, Henrik Bolten, who replaced it with the current building in 1771. In 1783 he was ennobled with the title of Baron von Bolten but in 1786 he went bankrupt and had to spend the last four years of his life as a tenant in the attic.

At the time of the 1787 census, No. 3 was home to two households. Bolten resided in the building with his 15-year-old son Johan Henrich Bolten, the 29-year-old hofmester Jørgen Kærulf, one male servant, one maid, one female cook and one caretaker. Christian Ludvig Schütz (1736-1812), a konferensråd, resided in the building with his wife Anna Johanna Schütz, the 21-year-old Christiane Hinkeldei, a housekeeper, a male servant, a maid, a female cook, a caretaker, a coachman, the 48-year-old Inger Catharine Canter. Canter's daughter Anne Johanne Styffgen, the 36-year-old Johanne Sophie Elisabeth Bentzen, and one more maid.

=== 19th century ===
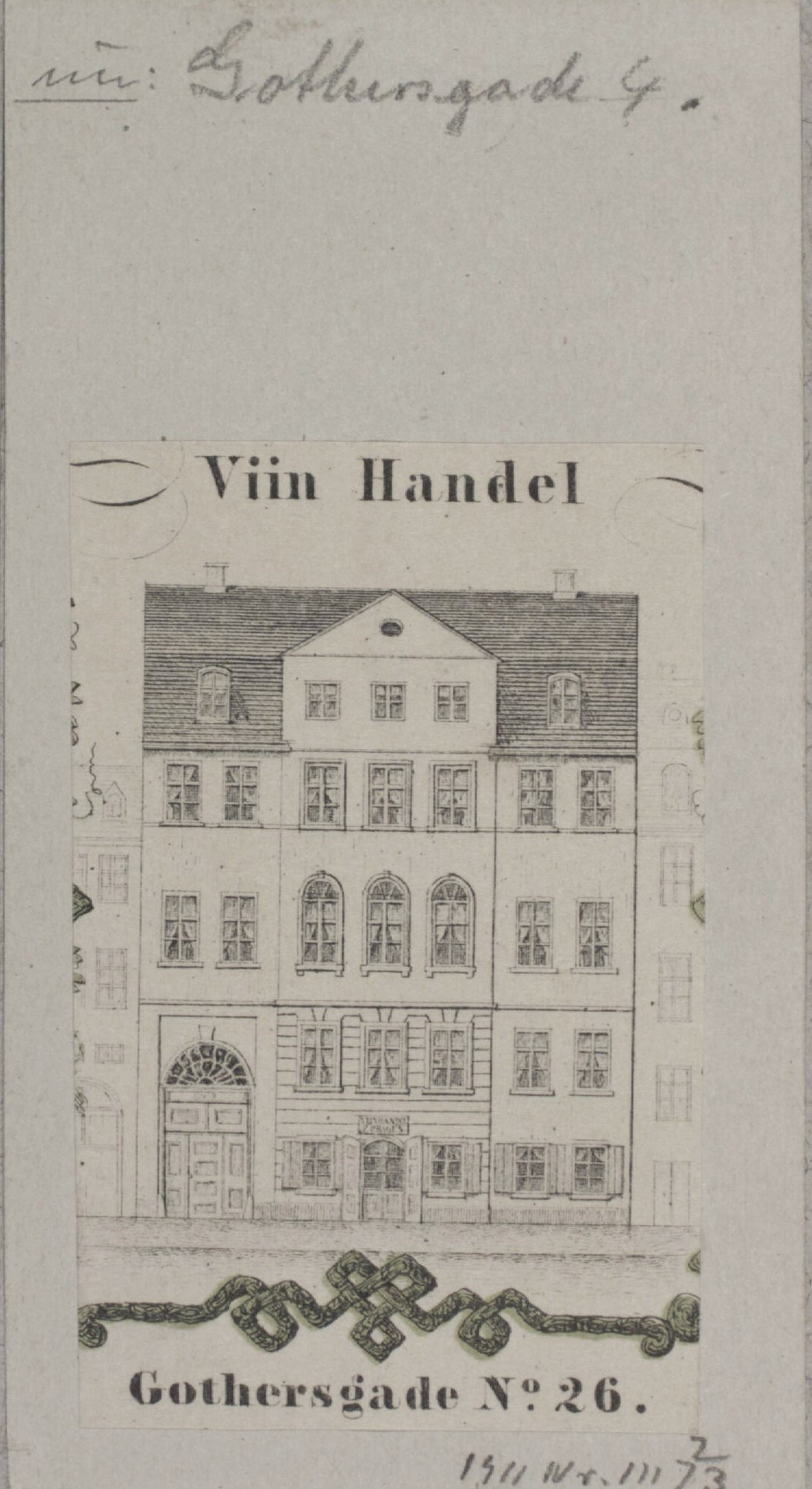
Advert for Hagen's wine business at Gothersgade No. 26.

The property was later acquired by wine merchant Haagen Hagen (Hagensen). At the time of the 1801 census, he resided in the building with his wife Caroline (née Høyer), their seven children (aged one to 13), three maids, five employees in Hagen's wine business (two of them apprentices), Hagen's brother Frantz Peder Hagen, Johan Henrich Knuth (1746-1792), a stiftsamtmand. resided in the other apartment with his 21-uear-old daughter Louise Knuth, the lady's companions Dorthea Cecilie Rabert and Henriette Charlotte Lamotte, kammerjomfru Barbara Brynnincke, a housekeeper, two maids, two male servants and a stableman.

In the new cadastre of 1806, the property was listed as No. 26. It was by then owned by wine merchant Hagen Hagen.

The property and wine business was later passed to Hagen's son Frantz Peter Hagen (1804-1874). At the time of the 1840 census, he resided on the ground floor with his wife Edvardine née Gram, their eight children (aged one to 17), the wife's father Edvard Gram, three employees in the wine business (one of them an apprentice, three male servants and four maids. John von Brackte, a traveller from the Danish West Indies, resided on the first floor with his 25-year-old daughter, three male servants and two maids.

The apartment on the first floor had by 1845 been taken over by hoflægermester Johan Philip Rogert Fønss (1796-1882). He had just (1844) sold Søbysøgaard and would later purchase Sophienholm. He lived there with Marie Elisabeth Hillerup (1794-1861), their five children (aged 10 to 22), a governess, two male servants and three maids. John Mac Caul (1786-1851), a merchant (grosserer) and translator, resided on the second floor with his wife Charlotte (née Benners), his brother Alexander Mac Caul, the wife's sister Nancy Benners and brother Isaac Benners, 41-year-old Henriette Koppen, 52-year-old Louisa Phipps, 22-year-old Flora Mac Pherson and two maids.

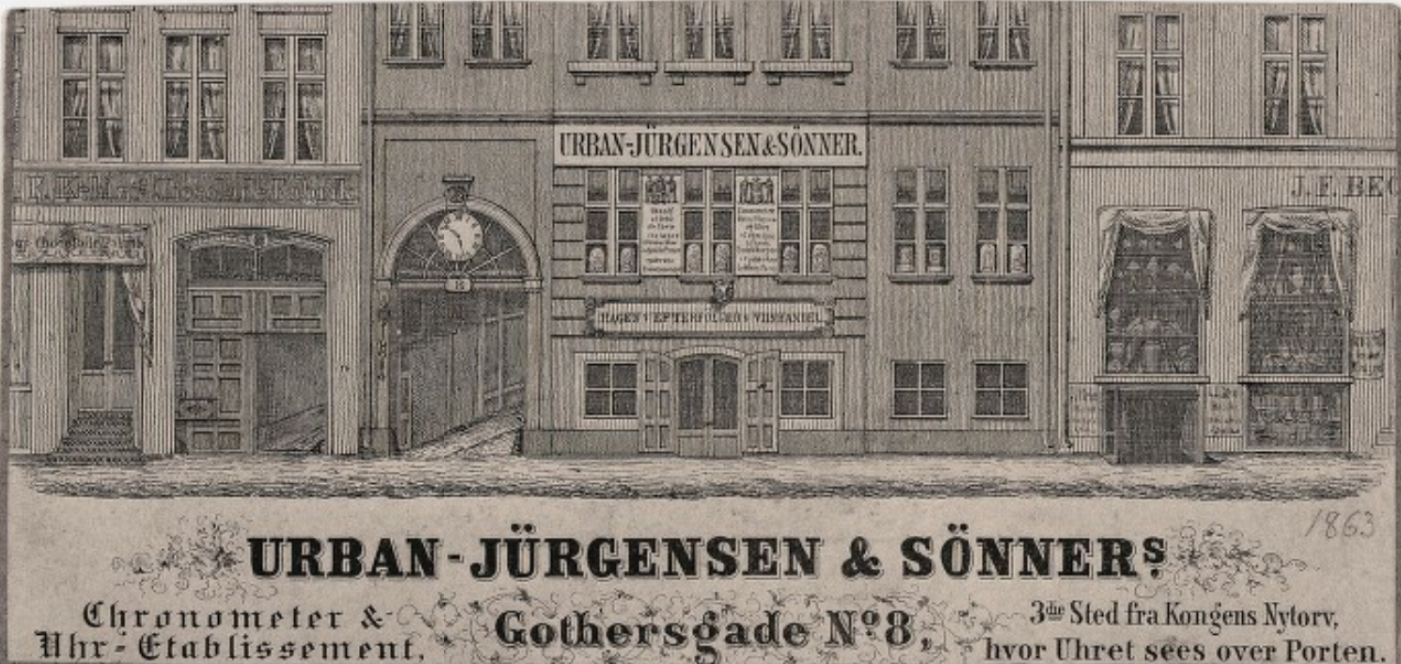
The Urban Jürgensen shop in Gothersgade in Copenhagen 1863

Urban Jürgensen & Sønner was later based in the building. The shop was some time after 1910 moved to Ny Østergade.

=== 20th century ===
The building was listed in 1918 together with its half-timbered rear wing from 1755.

In the 1980s it was refurbished and became a popular venue for Copenhagen's jetset. In 1991 the gallerists Patricia and Jacob Asbæk opened a gallery at the address. In 1997 the nightclub NASA opened on the top floor of the building and for a decade it remained one of Copenhagen's leading venues for the jetset. It filed for bankruptcy and closed temporarily in 2010, but started up shortly after in the same name.

== Today ==
The complex is now home to a food court.

== Gallery ==
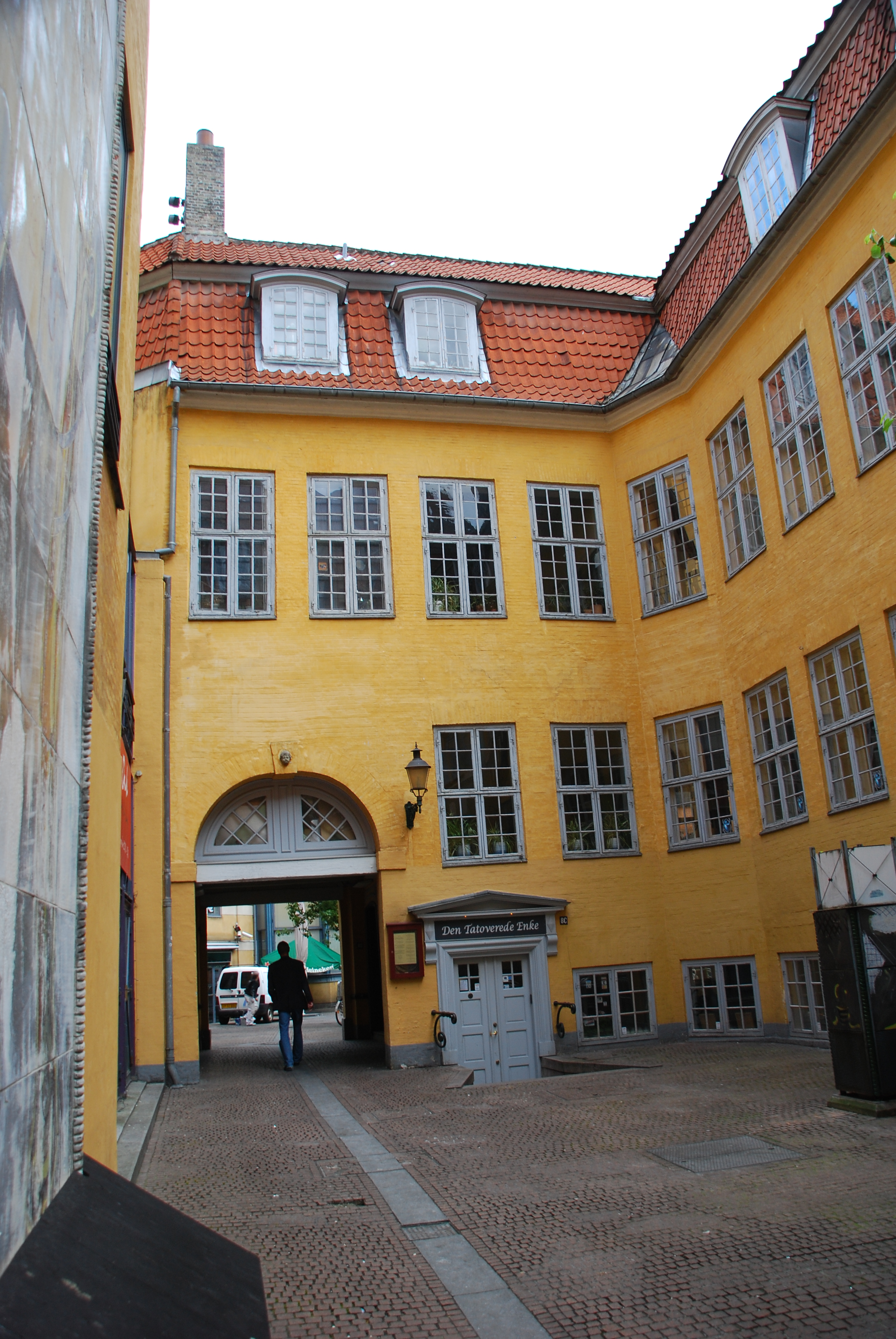

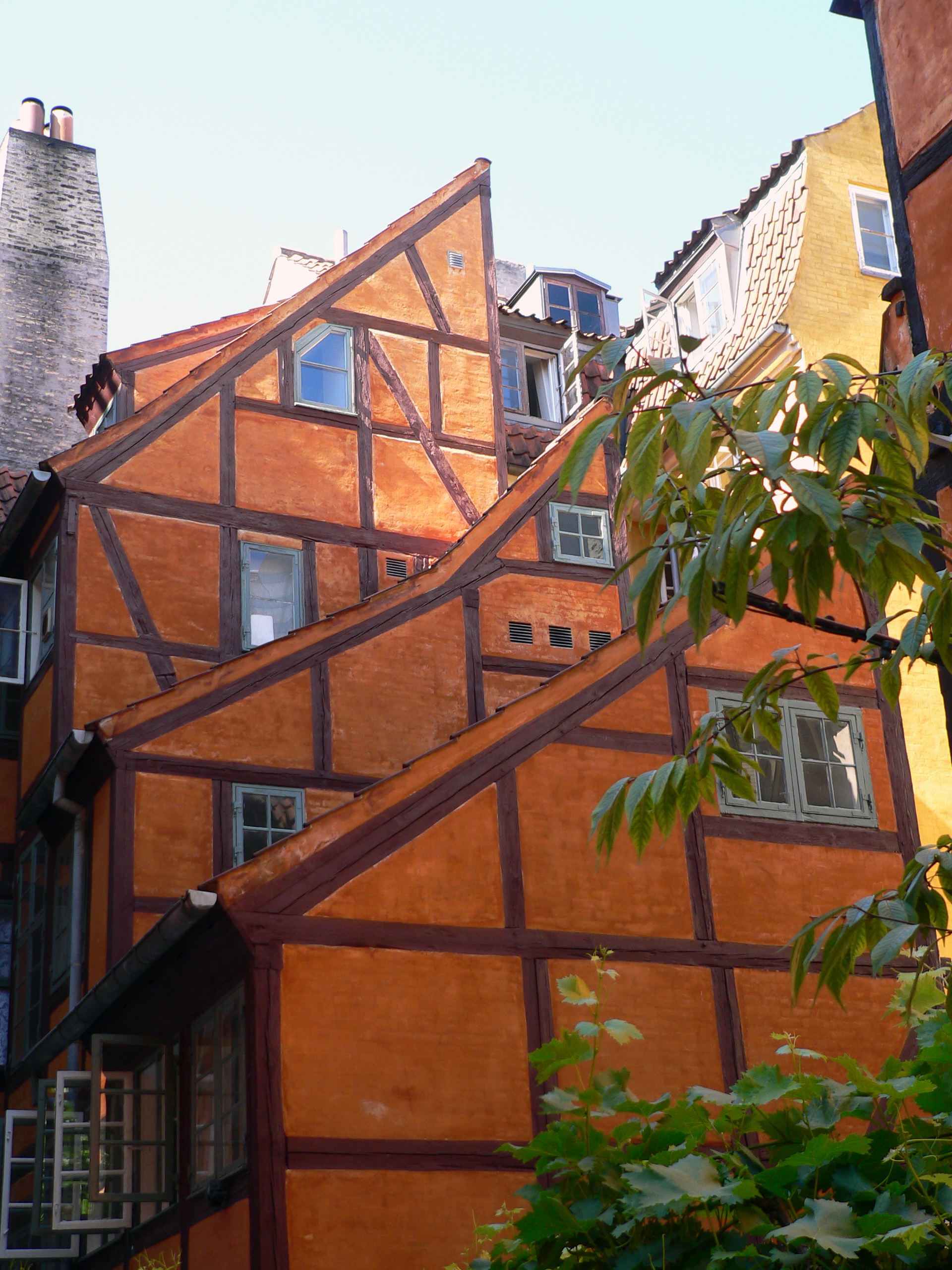
