= Ib Rehné =

Ib Rehné (18 January 1922 – 7 March 2005) was Danish Radio's correspondent in the Middle East for many years. Between 1976 and 1980 he reported from Cairo, from 1980 until 1983 in Rome, and in Paris between 1983 and 1993.

Many Danes remember his signature end to every report: "Ib Rehné, Cairo". Without intending to ridicule Ib Rehné, these three words have come to represent a kind of absurd humor. Among other places, there are cafes in Aalborg, Denmark and Sønderborg, Denmark called "Ib Rehné, Cairo". The coffee shop in Aalborg is actually named "Ib Rene, Cairo". It does not have the "h" as the owner of the cafe at the time had not asked Ib Rehne whether she could call the cafe by his name. His Cairo posting came after a short stint in Beirut in 1974 where he set up DR bureau in the Manarah district. The outbreak of the Lebanese civil war made reporting unsafe so he moved to Egypt where he could continue to cover and report on the Middle East story. During the sixties he reported from Yemen where he spoke of a great character he had befriended and who left a huge impression on him named Ali Conde (a European who settled and adopted Yemeni culture and introduced the publishing of colourful Yemeni stamps to generate income for the, then impoverished state). In 1966 and 1967, in Jordan and the West Bank, Ib produced in-depth radio features and radio documentaries and enjoyed access to official and opposition sources made easy by the neutral stance of DR. He reported on the Samu Incident when Israel launched a punitive attack prior to June 67 and reported extensively on the Six Day War from the Jordanian side. He recorded the plight of the 1967 refugees as they crossed the destroyed Allenby Bridge to escape the recently occupied West Bank. Ib's reports were distinguished by their professionalism, fairness and balance. He used sound in ways that stretched the boundaries of radio journalism.

Before deployment in the Middle East, he was a correspondent in Japan in 1970. He has also been a correspondent for the newspapers Berlingske Tidende, Weekendavisen, and state run Danmark TV 2.

Ib had enjoyed the loyalty and friendships of journalists and people in the Middle East, however, his most loyal companion was his Nagra Recorder, with which recorded various sounds and effects, and his Rolleiflex Camera.

He was a member of the Radio Council 1975-78 and has written a few books in Danish.

Ib Rehné spent his last years in Burgundy, France.
