= Princess Elisabeth of Denmark =

Danish princess (1935–2018)

Princess Elisabeth
- Born: 8 May 1935; Copenhagen, Denmark
- Died: 19 June 2018 (aged 83); Sorgenfri Palace, Lyngby-Taarbæk Municipality, Denmark
- Burial: 25 June 2018; Lyngby Church, Lyngby-Taarbæk Municipality, Denmark
Names
- Elisabeth Caroline-Mathilde Alexandrine Helena Olga Thyra Feodora Estrid Margrethe Désirée
- House: Glücksburg
- Father: Knud, Hereditary Prince of Denmark
- Mother: Princess Caroline-Mathilde of Denmark

Princess Elisabeth of Denmark (Elisabeth Caroline-Mathilde Alexandrine Helena Olga Thyra Feodora Estrid Margrethe Désirée; 8 May 1935 – 19 June 2018) was a member of the Danish royal family. The only daughter and eldest child of Knud, Hereditary Prince of Denmark, and Princess Caroline-Mathilde of Denmark, she was a granddaughter of Christian X, niece of Frederik IX, and first cousin of Margrethe II.

In addition to undertaking occasional royal duties, she was a career diplomat with the Ministry of Foreign Affairs of Denmark.

== Early life and education ==
Elisabeth was born on 8 May 1935 in Copenhagen to Prince Knud and Princess Caroline-Mathilde of Denmark. Her father was the second son of Christian X. She was christened at Lyngby Church in July 1935 and confirmed there in May 1950. The family resided at Sorgenfri Palace in Kongens Lyngby, where she was raised with her two younger brothers Prince Ingolf and Prince Christian.

During the 1938-39 Mørkefjord expedition, paleontologist Eigil Nielsen named the Princess Elisabeth Alps in northeastern Greenland after her.

Elisabeth began her education privately at Sorgenfri. After passing her secondary school examinations in 1952, she studied for one year at Brillantmont International School in Switzerland. Subsequently, she attended Suhr's School of Home Economics and then Margrethe-Skolen (now the Scandinavian Academy of International Fashion and Design) from 1954 to 1956.

In 1953, when succession to the Danish throne switched from agnatic primogeniture to male-preference primogeniture, Elisabeth gained succession rights and became seventh in line to the throne. After her brothers married without the King's consent and thus lost their rights and after Margrethe II's accession in 1972, until the birth of Count Nikolai in 1999, she was 4th in line, after the Queen's two sons and her other cousin, Princess Benedikte. At the time of her death, she was 12th in line. She was titled of Prinsesse til Danmark (literally translated as "Princess to Denmark", reserved for members of the Royal Family in the line of succession) with the style of Highness. She was the only one of her siblings to retain her title and succession rights, as her younger brothers married commoners without the permission of their uncle, Frederik IX.

== Career ==
In 1956, Elisabeth began her career with the Danish Ministry of Foreign Affairs. She was posted to the Embassy of Denmark, Washington, D.C. from 1973 to 1976 and again from 1981 to 1985. Her final foreign posting was to the Danish mission to the United Nations in Geneva from 1989 to 1993. She retired from the foreign service in 2001.

In addition to her diplomatic career, Elisabeth occasionally undertook royal duties on behalf of her uncle and later cousin. She was patron of Selskabet Kjæden, the Danish-Brazilian Association, the Danish-Japanese Society, and Præmieselskabet for Plejemødre af 1861.

== Personal life and death ==
Elisabeth never married nor had children. She lived for many years in a villa in Furesø Municipality with her long-term partner, filmmaker Claus Hermansen, who died in 1997. In 2015, she sold the villa and with the Queen's approval, moved to the classical wing Damebygningen of Sorgenfri Palace, which was her childhood home. The Damebygningen was previously occupied by the Princess' younger brother, Count Christian and his wife. In that same year, Princess Elisabeth celebrated her 80th birthday, on which occasion Margrethe II and Prince Consort gave a private family dinner for her at Fredensborg Palace, which was attended also by the Queen's son, Prince Joachim and his wife, Princess Marie, her brother and sister-in-law, Count Ingolf and Countess Sussie, and several of the Princess' friends.

After a long period of ill health, Elisabeth died on 19 June 2018, at the age of 83. Her funeral took place at Lyngby Church on 25 June 2018, where her cremated remains were interred beside Hermansen.

== Honours ==
- 11 March 1962: Knight of the Order of the Elephant (R.E.)
- Medal of Merit in Silver (F.M.2)
- 9 September 1970: Medal for the 100th Anniversary of the Birth of King Christian X (M.M.26.sept. 1870–1970)
- 28 March 2001: Queen Ingrid Commemorative Medal (Dr.I.M.M.)
- 16 April 2015: Commemorative Medal on the Occasion of the 75th Birthday of Her Majesty Queen Margrethe (EM.16.apr.2015)
- 11 June 2018: Prince Henrik's Commemorative Medal (Pr.H.Mm.)

== Ancestry ==
Ancestors of Princess Elisabeth of Denmark

8. Frederik VIII of Denmark
4. Christian X of Denmark
9. Princess Louise of Sweden
2. Knud, Hereditary Prince of Denmark
10. Frederick Francis III, Grand Duke of Mecklenburg-Schwerin
5. Duchess Alexandrine of Mecklenburg-Schwerin
11. Grand Duchess Anastasia Mikhailovna of Russia
1. Princess Elisabeth of Denmark
12. Frederik VIII of Denmark (= 8)
6. Prince Harald of Denmark
13. Princess Louise of Sweden (= 9)
3. Princess Caroline-Mathilde of Denmark
14. Friedrich Ferdinand, Duke of Schleswig-Holstein
7. Princess Helena of Schleswig-Holstein-Sonderburg-Glücksburg
15. Princess Karoline Mathilde of Schleswig-Holstein-Sonderburg-Augustenburg
