= Region of Eastern Denmark =

Region of Denmark

Region of Eastern Denmark Region Østdanmark (Danish)
- Region
- Logo
- Interactive map of Region of Eastern Denmark
- Coordinates: 55.5°N 12°E
- Sovereign state: Danish Realm
- Country: Denmark
- To be established: 1 January 2027
- Capital: Sorø
- Largest city: Copenhagen
- Municipalities: 46: Albertslund; Allerød; Ballerup; Bornholm; Brøndby; Copenhagen; Dragør; Egedal; Faxe; Fredensborg; Frederiksberg; Frederikssund; Furesø; Gentofte; Gladsaxe; Glostrup; Greve; Gribskov; Guldborgsund; Halsnæs; Helsingør; Herlev; Holbæk; Hillerød; Hvidovre; Høje-Taastrup; Hørsholm; Ishøj; Kalundborg; Køge; Lejre; Lolland; Lyngby-Taarbæk; Næstved; Odsherred; Ringsted; Roskilde; Rudersdal; Rødovre; Slagelse; Solrød; Sorø; Stevns; Tårnby; Vallensbæk; Vordingborg

Area
  - Total: 9,791 km^{2} (3,780 sq mi)
- Time zone: UTC+1 (CET)
  - Summer (DST): UTC+2 (CEST)
- Website: Official website

The Region of Eastern Denmark (Danish: Region Østdanmark) is a future administrative region of Denmark to be formed on 1 January 2027 from the merger of the Capital Region of Denmark and Region Zealand. It will contain 46 municipalities, including Copenhagen, Denmark's capital and largest city. The regional headquarters will be located in Sorø, where the headquarters of Region Zealand are currently located.

== Geography and demographics ==
The Region of Eastern Denmark includes all of Denmark east of the Great Belt, including the islands of Zealand, Amager, Lolland, Falster, Møn, Bornholm. To the west, Zealand is connected to the island of Funen in the Region of Southern Denmark via the Great Belt Fixed Link. To the east, Copenhagen is connected to Malmö, Sweden via the Øresund Bridge. To the south, the Fehmarn Belt fixed link from Lolland to the German island of Fehmarn is under construction.

In 2027, the Region of Eastern Denmark is projected to have a population of 2.78 million, corresponding to 46 percent of Denmark's population. Over 530,000 people in the region are projected to be over 65 years of age.

The region will not include the Ertholmene archipelago which is situated to the northeast of Bornholm.

== Creation and responsibilities ==
The Region of Eastern Denmark was created as a result of the healthcare reforms approved by the Danish government on 15 November 2024. The division of Zealand between two health regions led to an unequal distribution of health resources, which the merger aims to overcome. The act establishing the new region was signed into law on 20 June 2025.

Healthcare will be the main responsibility of the regional administration. In 2025, healthcare expenditures accounted for over 95% of Danish regional budgets. The region's responsibilities will include the management of hospitals, the integration of somatic and psychiatric care, and the planning and financing of primary care services delivered by general practitioners. The region will also be responsible for delivering specialized home nursing, rehabilitation, and local acute care, which are currently municipal responsibilities.

Beyond healthcare, other responsibilities of the region will include providing social services for citizens with special needs; soil remediation and groundwater protection; mining; climate neutrality; youth and adult education; and regional bus and rail public transport in concert with Movia, the regional transit agency. The municipality of Bornholm operates its own transit agency, BAT.

== Regional council ==
The regional council of Eastern Denmark has 47 members. Its first regional council was one of four regional councils elected in November 2025. Before the new region comes into effect on 1 January 2027, the regional council of Eastern Denmark will act as a preparatory committee, while the existing Capital and Zealand regional councils, elected in 2021, will continue to handle their operational tasks through the end of 2026 until the Region of Eastern Denmark begins its work in 2027.

== Health councils and municipalities ==
A map of the Danish health councils from 2027 onwards.

Map of the municipalities of the Capital Region

Map of the municipalities of Region Zealand

To strengthen cooperation between the region and its municipalities, six health councils will be established in Eastern Denmark, which consist of regional council members and municipal politicians. These health councils will replace the standing committees previously part of each regional council. Responsibility for the 46 municipalities in the region will be divided between the six health councils as follows:

Hovedstaden:

- Bornholm
- Copenhagen
- Frederiksberg

Amager og Vestegnen:

- Albertslund
- Brøndby
- Dragør
- Glostrup
- Hvidovre
- Høje-Taastrup
- Ishøj
- Tårnby
- Vallensbæk

København Omegn Nord:

- Ballerup
- Egedal
- Furesø
- Gentofte
- Gladsaxe
- Herlev
- Lyngby-Taarbæk
- Rudersdal
- Rødovre

Nordsjælland:

- Allerød
- Fredensborg
- Frederikssund
- Gribskov
- Halsnæs
- Helsingør
- Hillerød
- Hørsholm

Østsjælland og Øerne:

- Faxe
- Greve
- Køge
- Lolland
- Guldborgsund
- Roskilde
- Solrød
- Stevns
- Vordingborg

Midt- og Vestsjælland:

- Holbæk
- Kalundborg
- Lejre
- Næstved
- Odsherred
- Ringsted
- Slagelse
- Sorø

== Hospitals ==
The Region of Eastern Denmark will manage the following hospitals, which have a total of 21 branches as of the end of 2025:

- Amager and Hvidovre Hospital, with locations in Amager and Hvidovre
- Bispebjerg and Frederiksberg Hospital, with locations in Bispebjerg and Frederiksberg, although the Frederiksberg location is scheduled to close beginning gradually from 2027 and transfer its functions to Bispebjerg
- Bornholm Hospital on the island of Bornholm
- Herlev and Gentofte Hospital, with locations in Gentofte and Herlev
- Holbæk Hospital, with locations in Holbæk, Kalundborg, and Nykøbing Sjælland
- Næstved, Slagelse and Ringsted Hospital, with locations in Næstved and Slagelse
- North Zealand Hospital, with locations in Frederikssund, Helsingør, and Hillerød
- Rigshospitalet, with locations in Blegdamsvej and Glostrup
- Zealand University Hospital, with locations in Køge, Nakskov, Nykøbing Falster, and Roskilde

The Region will also manage 14 psychiatric centres and departments.

== See also ==
- 2025 Danish local elections
