= Copenhagen University Hospital =

Hospital network in Denmark

Copenhagen University Hospital is a conglomerate of several hospitals in Region Hovedstaden and Region Sjælland in Denmark, together with the Faculty of Health and Medical Sciences at the University of Copenhagen.

== List of member hospitals ==
- In Region Hovedstaden
  - Region Hovedstadens Psykiatri
  - Amager Hospital
  - Bispebjerg Hospital
  - Bornholms Hospital
  - Frederiksberg Hospital
  - Gentofte Hospital
  - Glostrup Hospital
  - Herlev Hospital
  - Frederikssund Hospital
  - Helsingør Hospital
  - Hillerød Hospital
  - Hvidovre Hospital
  - Rigshospitalet
- In Region Sjælland
  - Fakse Sygehus
  - Holbæk Sygehus
  - Kalundborg Sygehus
  - Køge Sygehus
  - Roskilde Sygehus
  - Nakskov Sygehus
  - Nykøbing F. Sygehus
  - Næstved Sygehus
  - Ringsted Sygehus
  - Slagelse Sygehus

Steno Diabetes Center is an affiliate member of the University Hospital.
