= List of hospitals in Denmark =

This is a list of hospitals in Denmark.

- Capital Region of Denmark
  - Amager Hospital on the island of Amager, Copenhagen
  - Bispebjerg Hospital in Copenhagen
  - Bornholms Hospital on the island of Bornholm
  - Frederiksberg Hospital in Frederiksberg
  - Gentofte Hospital in Gentofte
  - Glostrup Hospital in Glostrup
  - Herlev Hospital in Herlev
  - Hvidovre Hospital in Hvidovre
  - Nordsjællands Hospital in Esbønderup, Frederikssund, Hillerød, Elsinore, and Hørsholm
  - Privathospitalet Danmark in Charlottenlund
  - Region Hovedstadens Psykiatri - psychiatric hospital with many centers around the region
  - Rigshospitalet in Copenhagen
  - Sct. Hans Hospital in Roskilde
- Region Sjælland
  - Fakse Sygehus in Fakse
  - Holbæk Sygehus in Holbæk
  - Kalundborg Sygehus in Kalundborg
  - Korsør Sygehus in Korsør
  - Køge Sygehus in Køge
  - Nakskov Sygehus in Nakskov
  - Nykøbing Falster Sygehus in Nykøbing Falster
  - Nykøbing Sjællands Sygehus in Nykøbing Sjælland
  - Næstved Sygehus in Næstved
  - Ringsted Sygehus in Ringsted
  - Roskilde Sygehus in Roskilde
  - Slagelse Sygehus in Slagelse
- Region of Southern Denmark
  - Augustenborg Psykiatrisk Hospital in Augustenborg
  - Brørup Hospital in Brørup
  - Esbjerg Hospital in Esbjerg
  - Fredericia Hospital in Fredericia
  - Fåborg Hospital in Fåborg
  - Give Hospital in Give
  - Grindsted Hospital in Grindsted
  - Haderslev Hospital in Haderslev
  - Kolding Hospital in Kolding
  - Middelfart Hospital in Middelfart
  - Nyborg Hospital in Nyborg
  - Odense Universitetshospital in Odense
  - Ribe Psykiatrisk Hospital in Ribe
  - Ringe Hospital in Ringe
  - Svendborg Hospital in Svendborg
  - Sønderborg Hospital in Sønderborg
  - Tønder Hospital in Tønder
  - Vejle Hospital in Vejle
  - Ærøskøbing Hospital on the island of Ærø
  - Aabenraa Hospital in Aabenraa
- Region Midtjylland
  - Regionshospitalet Brædstrup in Brædstrup
  - Regionshospitalet Grenaa in Grenaa
  - Regionshospitalet Hammel Neurocenter in Hammel
  - Regionshospitalet Herning in Herning
  - Regionshospitalet Holstebro in Holstebro
  - Regionshospitalet Horsens in Horsens
  - Regionshospitalet Kjellerup in Kjellerup
  - Regionshospitalet Lemvig in Lemvig
  - Regionshospitalet Odder in Odder
  - Regionshospitalet Randers in Randers
  - Regionshospitalet Ringkøbing in Ringkøbing
  - Regionshospitalet Samsø on the island of Samsø
  - Regionshospitalet Silkeborg in Silkeborg
  - Regionshospitalet Skanderborg Sundhedscenter in Skanderborg
  - Regionshospitalet Skive in Skive
  - Regionshospitalet Tarm in Tarm
  - Regionshospitalet Viborg in Viborg
  - Aarhus Universitetshospital Skejby in Aarhus
  - Århus Universitetshospital Risskov in Århus
  - Aarhus University Hospital in Aarhus
- Region Nordjylland
  - Aalborg Sygehus in Aalborg, Dronninglund, and Brovst
  - Sygehus Vendsyssel in Hjørring, Frederikshavn, and Brønderslev
    - Sundhedscenter Skagen in Skagen
  - Sygehus Himmerland in Farsø, Hobro, and Terndrup
  - Sygehus Thy-Mors in Thisted and Nykøbing Jylland
- Private Hospitals
  - Agata Privathospital in Rungsted Kyst
  - Allerød Privathospital in Allerød
  - Dan Clinic in Beder
  - Erichsens Privathospital in Klampenborg
  - Esbjerg Privathospital in Esbjerg
  - Aleris-Hamlet Hospitaler in Frederiksberg, Aalborg, Ringsted, Århus and Herning
  - Hellerup Privathospital in Hellerup
  - Ciconia Århus Privathospital in Højbjerg
  - Privathospitalet Kollund in Kollund
  - Absalon Privatklinik in Copenhagen
  - Nygart Privathospital in Copenhagen
  - Parkens Privathospital in Copenhagen
  - Privathospitalet Mølholm in Herlev, Odense, Risskov, Vejle, and Århus
  - Privathospitalet Hunderup in Odense
  - Privathospitalet Skørping in Skørping
  - HjerteCenter Varde in Varde
  - Dagkirurgisk Hospital Viborg in Viborg
  - Søllerød Privathospital in Virum
  - Aros Privathospital in Århus
  - Grymer Privathospital in Århus
