= Anne-Lise Salling Larsen =

Danish nurse and professor (1934–2022)

- Born: 25 May 1934; Odense, Denmark
- Died: 20 January 2022 (aged 87)
- Occupations: Nurse; Professor
- Years active: 1959-2009
- Spouse: Mogens Salling Larsen (m. 1967; died 2022)
- Children: 2

Anne-Lise Salling Larsen (25 May 1934 – 20 January 2022) was a Danish nurse and professor. She worked as a development nurse at Bispebjerg Hospital and also at Rigshospitalet Glostrup as a senior nurse from 1965 to 1971, and was the author of a weekly column for the professional monthly journal Sygeplejersken as a nursing editor from 1974 to 1978. Larsen was later a research nurse at the Danish Institute for Health and Nursing Research between 1982 and 1986 and then at the Hvidovre Hospital from 1986 to 1993. She was the first Danish professor of nursing to be appointed in 1993 and worked as Research Council Professor at Odense University until 1998.

== Early life ==
Larsen was born on 25 May 1934 in Odense. She was the daughter of the goldsmith Theodor Hofmann Hansen and the business owner business owner Ellen Gøtke. Larsen had one sister. She was educated at the Sct. Knuds Gymnasium, graduating with a Danish high school diploma in 1953. Larsen studied at the Odense Nursing School from 1954 to 1957. The headmistress, Deaconess Karna Jensen, was sceptical about what a girl with a high school diploma wanted in nursing, where students most often had obtained either a secondary school or high school diploma.

== Career ==
In 1959, she went to Boston in the United States to work with paediatric nursing and participate in professional courses at Harvard University. Larsen worked as a development nurse at Bispebjerg Hospital and also at Rigshospitalet Glostrup as a senior nurse from 1965 to 1971. She was employed by Tidsskrift at the professional monthly journal Sygeplejersken as a nursing editor with a weekly column from 1974 to 1978. Larsen was a member of the executive board of the Danish Red Cross during the same time period. She participated weekend courses in research held by the Danish Medical Association at the Danish College of Nursing at Aarhus University.

Larsen became a research nurse at the Danish Institute for Health and Nursing Research from 1982 to 1986 and then at the Hvidovre Hospital from 1986 to 1993. She was a member of the Ministry of the Interior's Committee for Health and Economics in the Health Sector between 1983 and 1984 and was a nursing consultant at the Scientific Ethics Committee for the municipalities of Copenhagen and the Free State from 1994 to 1997. Larsen obtained a Doctor Medicinae after defending her thesis Stimulation of patients’ activity and development at the medical faculty of Odense University in 1990. Following the completion of her doctorate, she was appointed as the first Danish professor of nursing in 1993, working as Research Council Professor at Odense University until 1998. Larsen was a representative of clinically oriented nursing research and particularly emphasised the importance of active collaboration between caregivers, patients and therapists.

She was a referee and member of the editorial board of the Nordic journal for nursing research Vård i Norden from 1990. From 1996, Larsen was a member of the steering committee for European Research in Intensive Care Units and from 1997 was a member of the Nordic Academy of Nursing Science. She was the author of the works Metodebog i sygeplejen in 1978 and Videnskabelig sygepleje in 1991. Larsen was also active in politics. She was a member of the board of the Venstre political party's local district for Lyngby/Taarbæk and of the county board for Venstre in Copenhagen County from 1986 to 1994. Larsen was also a member of the Elderly Affairs Committee on Health Matters in Lyngby-Taarbæk Municipality from 2002 to 2009.

== Personal life ==
She was married to the specialist Mogens Salling Larsen from 6 May 1967 to her death on 20 January 2022. There were two children of the marriage. Her funeral took place at Virum Church on 3 February 2022.
