= Results of the 2025 Danish regional elections =

These are detailed results of the 2025 Danish municipal elections. Data is collected from the election distributor of Denmark.

== Seats ==
Division	A	B	C	F	I	M	O	V	Æ	Ø	Å	Others
Division	#	#	#	#	#	#	#	#	#	#	#	#
Denmark	32	8	15	15	8	1	11	28	7	8	0	1

=== By region ===
Division	A	B	C	F	I	M	O	V	Æ	Ø	Å	Others
Division	%	%	%	%	%	%	%	%	%	%	%	%
North Denmark	6	1	3	2	1	0	1	8	2	1	0	0
Central Denmark	8	2	3	4	2	0	2	6	2	1	0	1
Southern Denmark	8	1	2	3	2	0	3	9	2	1	0	0
Eastern Denmark	10	4	7	6	3	1	5	5	1	5	0	0

== Vote share ==
Division	A	B	C	F	I	M	O	V	Æ	Ø	Å	Others
Division	%	%	%	%	%	%	%	%	%	%	%	%
Denmark	22.1	6.5	10.8	10.8	5.9	1.8	9.0	17.1	5.4	7.3	1.3	2.0

=== By electoral division ===
Division	A	B	C	F	I	M	O	V	Æ	Ø	Å	Others
Division	%	%	%	%	%	%	%	%	%	%	%	%
Mid & Northern Jutland	24.2	4.5	9.4	10.1	6.1	1.1	5.4	21.5	8.3	4.8	1.1	3.5
Zealand & Southern Denmark	23.3	3.9	8.1	9.7	5.7	2.1	12.7	21.4	6.1	5.0	0.9	1.2
Capital	18.6	11.5	15.2	12.8	6.1	2.2	8.8	7.6	1.5	12.5	2.1	1.2

=== By constituency ===
Division	A	B	C	F	I	M	O	V	Æ	Ø	Å	Others
Division	%	%	%	%	%	%	%	%	%	%	%	%
North Jutland	25.0	3.9	10.2	8.5	5.0	0.9	4.5	27.0	9.2	3.9	0.5	1.3
West Jutland	20.3	3.5	9.3	7.9	6.5	0.7	6.3	25.8	11.0	2.7	0.8	5.2
East Jutland	26.1	5.6	9.0	12.5	6.5	1.5	5.5	14.9	5.9	6.7	1.7	4.0
South Jutland	21.8	2.6	5.7	8.0	6.0	1.9	13.0	28.1	7.4	3.6	0.7	1.3
Funen	23.9	4.7	8.8	12.3	5.4	2.2	8.6	21.1	5.1	6.1	1.2	0.6
Zealand	24.3	4.4	9.8	9.5	5.6	2.2	15.0	16.1	5.5	5.4	0.8	1.5
North Zealand	17.9	8.6	19.1	10.8	7.4	2.6	11.0	11.8	2.4	5.9	1.3	1.1
Greater Copenhagen	22.4	10.7	16.6	11.5	5.8	2.1	11.4	6.7	1.6	8.6	1.2	1.3
Copenhagen	15.1	14.0	12.3	15.1	5.7	2.0	5.5	5.7	0.8	19.3	3.3	1.1
Bornholm	46.0	2.6	5.5	5.6	1.9	0.6	16.2	7.6	2.7	7.1	0.5	3.6

=== By region ===
Division	A	B	C	F	I	M	O	V	Æ	Ø	Å	Others
Division	%	%	%	%	%	%	%	%	%	%	%	%
North Denmark	25.0	3.9	10.2	8.5	5.0	0.9	4.5	27.0	9.2	3.9	0.5	1.3
Central Denmark	23.9	4.8	9.1	10.7	6.5	1.2	5.8	19.1	7.9	5.1	1.3	4.5
Southern Denmark	22.7	3.5	7.0	9.9	5.7	2.0	11.1	25.1	6.4	4.6	0.9	1.0
Eastern Denmark	20.4	9.2	13.5	11.7	5.9	2.2	10.8	10.3	2.8	10.3	1.7	1.3

=== By municipality ===
Division	A	B	C	F	I	M	O	V	Æ	Ø	Å	Others
Division	%	%	%	%	%	%	%	%	%	%	%	%
Læsø	15.6	2.9	29.2	6.2	1.6	1.1	9.3	13.1	16.1	2.9	0.6	1.4
Frederikshavn	27.7	1.5	8.3	8.6	3.8	2.0	5.8	28.0	10.9	2.1	0.3	1.1
Hjørring	30.8	4.0	12.6	5.6	2.8	0.9	4.6	25.1	7.9	3.0	0.2	2.5
Brønderslev	24.5	2.4	9.2	9.6	3.5	0.8	4.8	29.8	11.0	2.8	0.2	1.4
Jammerbugt	22.0	1.7	7.3	6.5	4.9	0.4	5.7	37.8	9.0	2.0	0.3	2.5
Thisted	24.5	2.4	11.8	7.1	7.1	0.4	5.5	23.6	12.0	4.1	0.4	1.0
Morsø	31.5	1.8	9.7	3.0	2.2	0.3	3.6	37.2	7.9	2.1	0.2	0.5
Vesthimmerland	15.2	1.9	22.8	6.9	3.4	0.3	3.4	29.8	13.3	1.4	0.1	1.5
Rebild	17.3	5.9	17.4	9.0	4.2	0.6	3.4	24.7	12.9	3.6	0.4	0.6
Mariagerfjord	31.9	1.9	6.8	6.6	4.4	0.8	4.6	22.9	16.4	2.0	1.0	0.7
Aalborg	24.3	6.1	7.8	11.0	6.7	1.1	4.1	25.4	5.8	6.0	0.6	1.0
Lemvig	12.1	4.0	2.2	11.0	1.7	0.3	3.5	43.9	17.2	1.1	0.3	2.7
Struer	29.9	2.6	4.0	6.3	7.5	0.4	5.3	31.3	8.9	1.5	0.2	2.2
Skive	23.4	1.4	3.0	7.4	4.2	0.5	5.4	34.4	15.1	2.7	0.4	2.1
Viborg	23.1	2.1	16.6	7.2	6.7	0.9	6.5	16.8	10.7	3.2	2.3	4.0
Silkeborg	19.1	4.0	10.4	11.1	8.9	0.8	5.3	25.3	6.4	5.0	0.7	2.9
Ikast-Brande	19.8	1.7	19.6	4.6	6.1	0.6	11.3	19.8	11.3	1.5	0.4	3.3
Herning	17.9	4.6	8.4	8.1	6.2	0.6	5.5	31.0	10.3	1.6	0.4	5.4
Holstebro	24.2	8.4	4.6	8.1	6.0	0.6	10.1	24.7	7.8	1.9	0.3	3.1
Ringkøbing-Skjern	14.2	1.7	3.3	5.2	5.9	0.6	3.7	24.3	19.7	1.4	0.2	19.7
Aarhus	23.3	7.9	10.1	15.4	6.7	1.8	3.8	11.4	3.6	9.2	2.5	4.3
Syddjurs	27.2	3.9	8.6	10.9	4.8	0.8	5.0	17.4	9.5	6.4	2.3	3.2
Norddjurs	33.8	1.3	4.8	9.1	6.3	0.9	8.4	18.7	10.1	3.6	0.6	2.4
Randers	28.5	2.6	5.8	11.3	5.7	1.2	8.9	17.5	9.9	3.9	0.6	4.2
Favrskov	32.0	4.2	10.8	7.7	6.4	0.7	5.4	18.0	7.2	3.9	0.7	2.9
Skanderborg	27.8	6.3	11.0	12.3	7.5	1.5	4.5	14.8	5.4	4.4	1.1	3.3
Odder	28.2	4.2	11.1	11.9	5.0	1.1	5.0	17.0	3.9	8.4	1.1	3.1
Samsø	16.5	2.5	22.6	13.9	1.7	0.5	3.0	21.0	2.7	10.4	2.6	2.7
Horsens	31.1	3.7	8.0	9.4	7.4	1.3	8.1	16.2	6.0	5.0	0.7	3.1
Hedensted	20.4	1.8	5.2	6.7	6.9	1.8	8.7	26.8	11.2	2.5	0.6	7.3
Sønderborg	29.8	1.5	3.0	6.0	6.3	1.6	12.9	26.7	6.8	3.9	0.5	1.0
Aabenraa	19.9	1.7	9.2	6.9	5.3	1.4	17.2	26.0	8.2	2.5	0.5	1.2
Tønder	15.0	1.0	2.8	6.0	3.7	1.2	15.6	41.8	8.8	1.6	0.6	1.9
Fanø	15.1	25.8	8.3	8.6	3.0	1.0	6.4	15.7	3.1	10.4	1.9	0.7
Esbjerg	23.3	2.2	7.6	8.4	5.7	1.5	10.5	27.2	7.0	4.5	0.4	1.7
Varde	19.5	1.5	3.8	6.3	8.1	1.3	10.1	35.0	11.0	1.6	0.4	1.4
Billund	22.0	1.3	3.0	4.7	4.2	2.2	10.2	35.5	13.6	1.7	0.8	0.9
Vejen	20.5	1.7	7.5	6.1	5.3	1.8	13.4	29.9	10.3	1.8	0.6	1.0
Vejle	23.1	3.9	5.5	10.2	5.9	2.7	9.9	26.8	6.7	3.1	1.1	1.2
Fredericia	23.0	2.0	6.8	8.8	6.4	1.8	13.8	23.0	5.3	7.4	0.7	0.9
Kolding	17.4	4.3	5.5	10.4	7.7	3.0	14.9	26.1	5.2	4.0	0.6	1.0
Haderslev	20.7	2.2	5.3	7.4	5.6	1.1	19.4	25.5	7.0	3.6	0.7	1.6
Odense	24.0	6.1	10.7	12.6	5.5	3.1	7.6	18.2	2.7	7.4	1.5	0.6
Assens	21.3	3.4	5.2	11.2	5.7	1.2	9.9	28.9	7.3	4.2	1.1	0.6
Middelfart	23.2	4.2	5.5	9.8	6.9	2.0	9.5	24.5	8.6	3.7	1.4	0.7
Nordfyn	24.2	2.3	4.2	8.7	3.6	1.1	9.3	34.6	8.1	2.7	0.7	0.5
Kerteminde	21.0	2.6	21.2	11.4	9.2	1.6	9.3	12.8	5.0	4.4	0.7	0.7
Nyborg	22.9	3.9	5.0	15.2	4.2	1.2	9.4	27.4	5.5	3.6	1.2	0.5
Svendborg	24.4	4.9	6.2	16.1	4.9	1.3	7.6	17.4	5.2	10.1	1.3	0.6
Langeland	16.2	3.7	10.8	13.8	3.5	3.1	9.8	26.0	6.2	5.1	1.2	0.6
Ærø	14.8	2.0	16.5	10.8	1.7	0.9	6.5	26.5	12.4	6.3	1.3	0.4
Faaborg-Midtfyn	30.6	3.6	6.9	10.5	4.8	1.6	10.5	18.8	7.1	4.2	0.9	0.6
Lolland	27.1	1.2	5.8	7.7	2.6	0.7	17.9	13.2	15.1	4.9	0.5	3.2
Guldborgsund	31.1	2.9	5.9	10.2	3.8	1.8	15.7	12.3	8.6	3.8	0.5	3.3
Vordingborg	21.3	4.5	6.2	9.9	5.5	9.9	15.2	13.1	5.1	7.2	0.9	1.2
Næstved	25.1	4.4	16.1	7.7	5.8	1.8	17.0	11.8	3.7	4.9	0.9	0.9
Faxe	21.0	2.2	6.5	8.3	6.4	1.3	20.5	20.8	6.3	4.5	0.8	1.4
Stevns	22.3	5.1	9.0	12.2	4.5	2.6	18.1	14.3	6.2	3.7	0.9	1.1
Køge	18.8	3.9	13.4	11.5	5.6	1.9	15.1	19.2	3.9	4.2	0.9	1.6
Lejre	15.4	5.3	6.7	19.8	5.7	1.5	11.1	20.6	4.6	7.1	1.0	1.2
Greve	21.0	4.8	8.2	6.4	8.0	2.0	16.8	21.6	2.4	5.8	0.7	2.3
Solrød	17.4	5.3	10.6	7.0	17.0	1.6	13.4	16.3	6.0	3.3	0.6	1.5
Roskilde	20.5	6.9	14.8	13.8	6.4	3.7	10.6	12.0	1.9	7.4	1.0	1.0
Holbæk	33.9	5.5	4.9	6.6	5.2	1.1	11.0	19.0	5.3	5.8	0.7	1.0
Kalundborg	24.3	3.3	4.5	8.6	4.8	1.4	19.5	18.4	8.4	4.9	0.6	1.2
Odsherred	38.9	4.7	4.0	7.3	3.5	0.9	14.8	11.2	7.1	5.1	1.0	1.4
Ringsted	20.1	3.0	28.4	7.9	3.3	0.7	10.7	13.7	4.4	5.5	0.8	1.5
Sorø	22.6	6.1	9.0	8.6	4.6	1.4	13.2	19.7	5.2	7.3	1.0	1.2
Slagelse	25.0	3.3	6.6	7.8	5.5	1.2	17.0	20.0	6.7	5.1	0.6	1.1
Helsingør	19.8	7.3	21.3	12.7	6.1	3.6	10.9	5.3	2.6	7.7	1.5	1.1
Fredensborg	19.8	10.9	18.3	10.4	6.7	3.0	11.5	9.8	1.4	5.2	1.8	1.3
Hørsholm	10.3	9.3	30.9	4.9	13.7	2.7	8.6	14.5	1.2	2.3	0.7	0.8
Hillerød	19.6	8.1	19.1	13.1	6.3	3.4	9.9	9.9	2.3	6.2	1.1	1.0
Gribskov	15.4	5.3	19.3	10.2	6.1	4.1	16.9	8.9	4.6	5.8	1.4	2.0
Halsnæs	27.4	3.2	7.6	15.6	4.6	1.5	15.0	9.5	5.3	6.1	3.2	1.0
Frederikssund	19.3	4.8	9.7	10.6	9.0	1.3	16.4	17.6	3.7	5.5	1.0	1.1
Egedal	22.1	8.1	11.9	10.3	8.6	2.2	12.2	14.0	3.1	5.4	0.8	1.3
Furesø	18.8	14.7	20.3	10.5	6.2	1.9	6.6	10.8	0.9	7.3	1.2	0.8
Allerød	14.2	9.5	21.5	12.4	6.1	2.0	8.0	17.7	1.1	5.9	0.8	0.8
Rudersdal	10.0	12.6	28.6	7.4	9.3	2.4	6.3	15.7	0.7	5.4	1.0	0.7
Gentofte	9.5	12.0	34.1	7.4	8.5	2.5	7.7	10.3	0.7	5.6	0.9	0.7
Lyngby-Taarbæk	13.6	15.4	26.6	11.4	7.0	2.2	6.5	8.4	0.7	6.2	1.2	0.8
Gladsaxe	22.2	13.5	8.8	14.3	5.4	2.5	9.7	8.3	1.9	10.9	1.3	1.2
Herlev	29.1	6.5	12.4	12.9	5.6	2.2	10.5	6.2	1.7	10.6	0.9	1.2
Rødovre	28.3	7.9	11.2	13.7	4.7	2.2	12.9	4.0	2.1	10.4	1.3	1.3
Hvidovre	25.0	9.5	10.2	17.4	5.2	1.9	13.6	4.5	2.1	8.4	1.0	1.3
Brøndby	28.3	10.2	8.3	10.3	4.2	2.1	17.0	4.2	2.0	10.6	1.6	1.4
Vallensbæk	20.4	7.9	25.6	8.4	7.3	1.8	12.5	5.0	1.8	7.4	1.0	1.0
Ishøj	29.4	9.8	6.6	8.5	4.6	2.2	15.4	6.3	2.3	10.4	2.1	2.6
Høje-Taastrup	21.8	10.6	21.7	8.9	4.3	1.9	14.1	4.6	1.9	8.0	1.1	1.1
Albertslund	25.3	11.3	7.4	16.1	3.8	1.2	11.9	3.3	1.5	14.4	2.1	1.8
Glostrup	28.9	7.9	8.5	9.3	5.3	1.6	13.9	9.9	3.0	7.4	1.0	3.4
Ballerup	33.9	7.9	8.9	10.6	6.1	2.4	13.7	5.6	1.6	7.2	1.1	1.1
Copenhagen	13.9	14.8	10.2	16.2	5.7	2.0	4.9	5.6	0.7	21.1	3.7	1.2
Frederiksberg	17.4	13.5	22.3	11.2	5.4	2.1	4.1	5.6	0.5	14.8	2.3	0.8
Tårnby	28.5	6.6	8.9	11.9	5.9	2.4	16.9	5.9	3.1	7.9	1.0	1.1
Dragør	16.3	6.2	34.0	8.4	6.9	3.0	9.7	8.3	1.9	3.7	0.8	0.8
Bornholm	46.0	2.6	5.5	5.6	1.9	0.6	16.2	7.6	2.7	7.1	0.5	3.6
