= Martin Lauritzen =

Danish neuroscientist and researcher

Martin Johannes Lauritzen
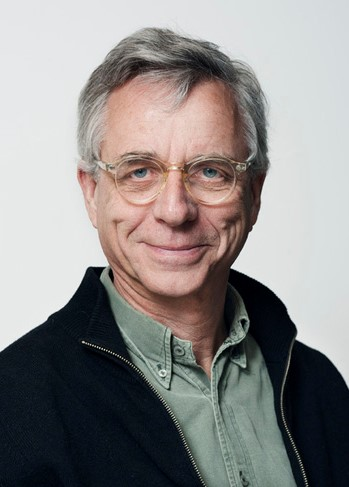
- Danish neuroscientist
- Occupations: Professor & senior consultant

Martin Johannes Lauritzen (born 1952) is a Danish neuroscientist. He is a Professor of Translational Neurobiology at the Department of Neuroscience, University of Copenhagen, Denmark and also a Professor of Clinical Neurophysiology at the Department of Neurophysiology, Rigshospitalet (The National Hospital of Denmark).

== Early life and education ==
Martin Johannes Lauritzen was born in the year 1952 in Copenhagen, Denmark. He earned his medical degree in 1978 and his Doctorate of Science (D.Med.Sci.) in 1988, both from University of Copenhagen, Denmark.

== Career ==
From 1980-85, Lauritzen worked as a Research Associate at the Department of Neurology at Rigshospitalet, at the Department of General Physiology at University of Copenhagen and at the Department of Biophysics and Physiology at New York University. From 1985 to 1994, he got his clinical education at Copenhagen University Hospitals. In 1994, he started working as Senior Consultant and later Head of Department of Clinical Neurophysiology at Glostrup Hospital (later Rigshospitalet Glostrup) and became Clinical Professor of Clinical Neurophysiology at the University of Copenhagen in 1998. In 2004, Lauritzen was a visiting professor at the Department of Experimental Neurology at Klinikum Charité, Humboldt University. Since 2007, Lauritzen is also employed as Professor of Translational Neurobiology at the Department of Neuroscience, University of Copenhagen, Denmark. Lauritzen has led a number of large research initiatives including a Strategic Brain Research Program at University of Copenhagen known as ‘Body & Mind’. In 2003, he was a founding member of the steering committee for COSBID, a large multi-center study of elucidating the mechanisms of acute brain disorders with focus on the impact of ‘brain tsunamis’, i.e. cortical spreading depolarization waves for the outcome of patients with brain trauma, hemorrhage and stroke. In 2009, Lauritzen was one of the co-founders of the national Center for Healthy Aging (2009), and he has been a principal investigator of the mechanisms of cognitive decline in brain aging including both animal experimental and human research. From 2009–2018, Lauritzen was Editor-in-chief of the Journal of Cerebral Blood Flow and Metabolism and since 2018 he is consulting editor of the Journal. Lauritzen currently serves as Director of the Lundbeck Foundation Research Initiative on Brain Barriers and Drug Delivery.

== Work ==
Lauritzen studies the mechanism of brain blood vessels, and the regulation of the cerebral circulation and the blood-brain barrier (BBB) in health and disease. In his early career, he identified the cortical mechanism that underlie migraine in patients as a cortical spreading depolarization wave, and he showed that the same mechanism contribute importantly to brain pathology in acute brain injuries. Now, using mouse models he has revealed new elements of the regulation of brain vascular responses to stimulation, and key mechanisms that guide vascular cells to direct oxygen and glucose to active nerve cells. Lauritzen has investigated the blood-brain barrier as diffusional barrier for macromolecules, that specific parts of small blood vessels control the trafficking of substances from blood and brain and that signalling molecules in the blood contribute to vascular barrier properties. His studies unravel pathophysiological mechanisms in acute brain disorders, and communication pathways between nerve networks and blood vessels needed to control brain energy supply in health and disease.

== Awards and honors ==
- 2017: Member of Academia Europaea
- 2016: Niels A. Lassen Prize
- 2004: Humboldt Research Award in Medicine (Alexander von Humboldt Stiftung, Germany)
- 1992: Arnold Friedman Distinguished Clinician/Researcher Award (American Headache Association).
- 1985: Fulbright Scholarship, Department of Biophysics, New York University, NY, USA.
- 1982: Harold G. Wolff Award (American Headache Association).
- 1982: Award of the Danish Neurological Society.
