= CapOpus =

Randomized controlled trial running in Denmark

CapOpus is the name of a randomized controlled trial (RCT) running in Denmark at Psychiatric Center Bispebjerg (part of Region Hovedstadens Psykiatri) and physically located at Bispebjerg Hospital in Copenhagen. It is an intervention aimed at reducing cannabis consumption in young persons with comorbid severe mental illness such as schizophrenia or schizotypal personality disorder, and cannabis dependency. It is run by psychiatrist Merete Nordentoft.

The aim of the RCT is to compare an approach using motivational interviewing, cognitive behaviour therapy, and the stages of change model compared with standard treatment. Among the trial's funders are the Lundbeck foundation, the Municipality of Copenhagen, and Sygekassernes Helsefond.

The primary outcome of the trial is reduction in number of days using cannabis, as measured by the timeline followback instrument. As secondary outcomes, the trial measures level of psychopathology in terms of positive and negative symptoms with the PANSS instrument; cognitive function using a set of validated tests; and quality of life and related life-areas measured with the Manchester Short Assessment of Quality of Life instrument and the World Health Organization's Disability Assessment Schedule.

The presence of mental illness and cannabis dependency, abuse, or harmful use is established using the SCAN interview's chapters 11 and 12.

The trial is, along with the English MIDAS Trial, among the only trials aimed at this particular group of comorbid substance abusers with schizophrenia.
