= Region Hovedstadens Psykiatri =

Geography
- Location: Multiple (mainly Copenhagen, northern Zealand, and Bornholm), Capital Region, Denmark

Organisation
- Type: Specialist
- Affiliated university: Copenhagen University

Services
- Speciality: Psychiatry

Links
- Lists: Hospitals in Denmark

Region Hovedstadens Psykiatri's logo in English

Region Hovedstadens Psykiatri (English: Mental Health Services in the Capital Region of Denmark) is a psychiatric hospital with centers spread all around the capital region (Region Hovedstaden) of Denmark, mainly consisting of Copenhagen, northern Zealand, and Bornholm.

Hospitals in Denmark are run by the administrative regions which came into effect with the municipal reform on January 1, 2007. Some months later, the psychiatry and somatics were administratively split apart, meaning that psychiatric departments of hospitals would no longer be under administration of the hospital they had been attached to. Instead, all the psychiatric departments in Region Hovedstaden would sort under a region-wide entity called Region Hovedstadens Psykiatri, which would in all matters be equivalent to more traditional hospitals, except that it wouldn't have a single location.

Most notably, Region Hovedstadens Psykiatri encompasses former psychiatric wards from such hospitals as Amager Hospital, Bispebjerg Hospital, Frederiksberg Hospital, Glostrup Hospital, Herlev Hospital, Hvidovre Hospital and Rigshospitalet. Though the psychiatric Sankt Hans Hospital in Roskilde does not geographically sort under Region Hovedstaden, it belongs to Region Hovedstadens Psykiatri administratively as well.

Region Hovedstadens Psykiatri has about 5,000 employees, and treats about 35,000 patients with mental disorders each year, which is about 40% of the total psychiatric treatment given in Denmark.

== Mental health centres ==
Region Hovedstadens Psykiatri is divided into mental health centres, each taking patients from their geographical areas. These are Mental Health Centre Amager, Mental Health Centre Copenhagen (a merger of the previous Mental Health Centres Bispebjerg and Rigshospitalet), Mental Health Centre Frederiksberg, Mental Health Centre Hvidovre, Mental Health Centre Sct. Hans, Mental Health Centre Ballerup, Mental Health Centre Bornholm, Mental Health Centre Gentofte, Mental Health Centre Glostrup, and Mental Health Centre Nordsjælland. In addition, there are individual mental health centres for children and adolescents in Bispebjerg, Glostrup, and Hillerød.

All of these centers have community mental health centers, and many of them have teams for assertive community treatment as well.

=== OPUS teams ===
OPUS teams for early detection and intensive case management of young psychotic patients were established in Aarhus and Copenhagen in 1998 by professor Merete Nordentoft. It started as a randomized controlled trial and has now become part of the Danish standard treatment program. Results from follow-up analysis at both one and two years revealed marked improvements in areas such as transition rates from schizotypal disorder to psychotic disorder, positive and negative symptoms, substance abuse, adherence to treatment, satisfaction with treatment, and other clinical and social outcome measures

== Research ==
Several research projects are undertaken in Region Hovedstadens Psykiatri. At Mental Health Centre Copenhagen, for instance, research projects about treatment of cannabis abuse in patients with a psychotic illness (the CapOpus trial), training of cognitive functioning in patients with schizophrenia (the Neurocom trial), and suicide prevention are currently running.

Mental Health Centre Glostrup houses the Center for Neuropsychiatric Schizophrenia Research (CNSR) which aims at investigating the association between brain functions and psychotic symptoms in patients with recent-onset schizophrenia. this involves psychopathological, neuropsychological, and psychophysiological tests and MRI, SPECT, and PET scans. CNSR was the first group to show the association between dopamine receptors and psychotic symptoms in patients with recent-onset schizophrenia.

Other research projects on depression, mania, somatoform disorders, sexology, anxiety, phobias, infant psychiatry etc. are also undertaken at the various mental health centres in Region Hovedstadens Psykiatri.

== Other ==
The hospital is a teaching hospital for medical students from Copenhagen University.
