= Merete Nordentoft =

Danish psychiatrist (born 1955)

- Born: 5 March 1955 (age 71); Frederiksberg, Denmark
- Occupations: Chief physician, Mental Health Centre Copenhagen; Professor of Psychiatry, University of Copenhagen
- Awards: Richard J. Wyatt Award (2016); The Novo Nordisk Prize (2020); Sasakawa Health Prize (2025)

Academic background
- Education: University of Copenhagen (MD, PhD, DMSc)

Academic work
- Discipline: Psychiatry
- Sub-discipline: Early intervention in psychosis; Suicide prevention; Epidemiology

Merete Nordentoft (born March 5, 1955) is a Danish psychiatrist, researcher and professor of clinical psychiatry at the University of Copenhagen. She is recognized for her work in suicide prevention and early intervention in psychosis. The early intervention program OPUS was first established as a research project in 1998 under her leadership; it was subsequently made the standard treatment for first-episode psychosis and schizophrenia spectrum disorders in Denmark.

She earned her PhD in 1994 and has been a chief psychiatrist at Bispebjerg Hospital since 1998. In 2007, she received the higher doctoral degree Doctor of Medical Science (DMSc) and also became a professor of clinical psychiatry. In 1997–1998 she co-authored a national plan for suicide prevention and contributed to the founding of the Danish Centre for Suicide Prevention.

Nordentoft is one of the most cited researchers in psychiatry internationally; as of 2025 she is on Clarivate's list of Highly Cited Researchers, placing her among the 0.1% most cited researchers worldwide. She is credited with helping secure domestic and international research grants worth DKK 700 million (US$110 million). The World Health Organization awarded her the 2025 Sasakawa Health Prize for "her outstanding innovative work in health development". In 2017 she received the Marie and August Krogh Prize, and in 2020 she received the Novo Nordisk Prize.

Nordentoft was president of International Early Psychosis Association from 2014 to 2016, and was honored with the association's Richard J. Wyatt Award for her contributions to early intervention. From 2022 to 2024, she served as president for the Schizophrenia International Research Society (SIRS). For her work on early intervention for first-episode psychosis as well as for her work on suicide prevention, she received the 2026 SIRS Lifetime Achievement Award. She was chairperson of the Danish Psychiatric Society in 2000–2002 and for a second period from 2022 to 2026.
