= Bornholms Hospital =

- Capital Region of Denmark
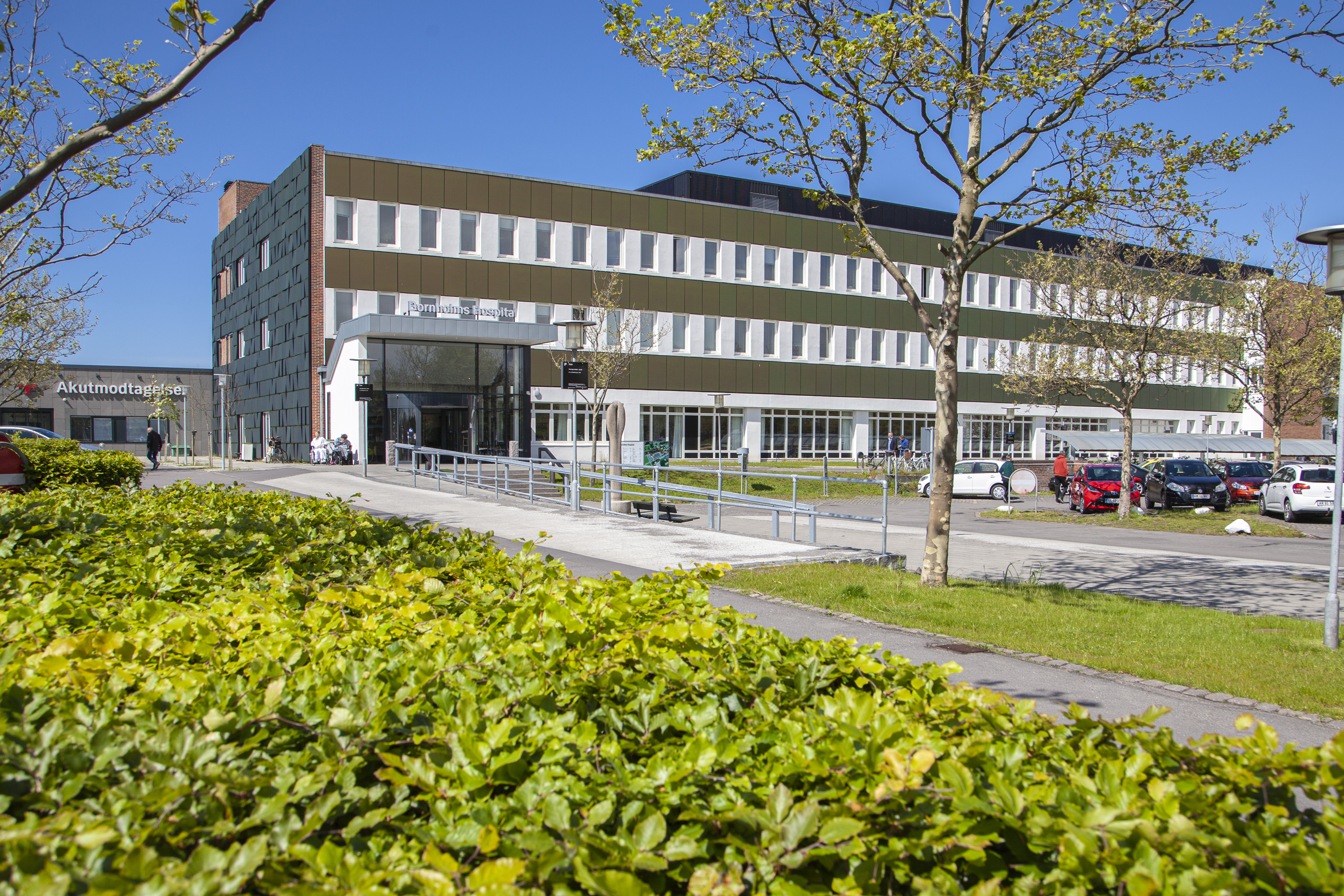

Geography
- Location: Bornholm, Capital Region, Denmark
- Coordinates: 55°5′30.63″N 14°42′27.41″E

Organisation
- Type: Teaching
- Affiliated university: University of Copenhagen

Services
- Emergency department: Yes

Helipads
- Helipad: Yes

History
- Founded: 2000

Links
- Website: www.bornholmshospital.dk
- Lists: Hospitals in Denmark

Bornholms Hospital (English: Hospital of Bornholm) is a hospital in the city of Rønne on the Danish island of Bornholm. Administratively, it falls under the domain of the Capital Region of Denmark along with hospitals in the greater Copenhagen area and northern Zealand. It serves a population of under 40,000 (2017) on Bornholm and Ertholmene. The hospital also physically hosts a mental health centre, which however falls administratively under the psychiatric hospital of Region Hovedstadens Psykiatri. Even before it became a part of the Capital Region of Denmark, some patients from the hospital were flown by helicopter to Rigshospitalet in Copenhagen Municipality.

The hospital is a teaching hospital for medical students from Copenhagen University.
