= Privathospitalet Danmark =

Geography
- Location: Charlottenlund just outside Copenhagen, Denmark
- Coordinates: 55.7539°N 12.5712°E

Organisation
- Type: General

History
- Opened: 1991

Links
- Lists: Hospitals in Denmark

Privathospitalet Danmark is Denmark's largest private hospital, established in 1991. It is situated in Charlottenlund just outside Copenhagen.

It has been in existence since 1991 and, since April 1, 2021, has been privately owned by Thomas Johnsen, who is the CEO. The day-to-day manager is hospital director Bettina Hard Madsen.

The hospital has operating rooms, 10 outpatient clinics, and a number of beds. The hospital also has modern X-ray equipment, and almost all types of diagnostic imaging can be performed on site.

Privathospitalet Danmark offers treatment in dermatology, neurology, pediatrics, X-ray, rheumatology, orthopedic surgery, physical therapy, neurosurgery, gynecology, mammography, and several types of scans and surgery, including plastic surgery.

The hospital is located at Jægersborg Allé 14 in Charlottenlund.
