= Gentofte Hospital =

- The Capital Region (Denmark)
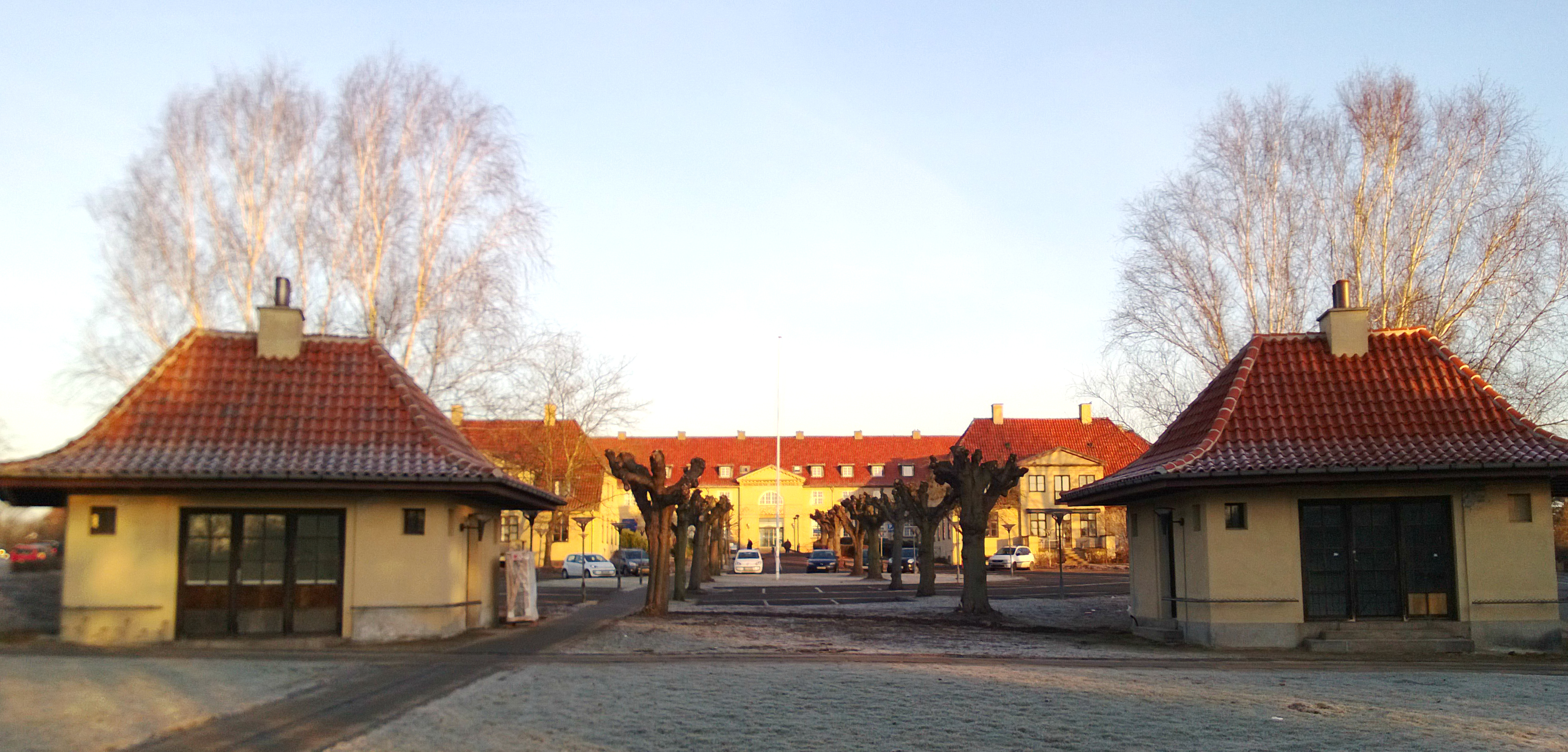

Geography
- Location: Gentofte, Capital Region, Denmark
- Coordinates: 55°44′21″N 12°32′47″E

Organisation
- Type: Teaching
- Affiliated university: University of Copenhagen

Services
- Emergency department: Yes

Helipads
- Helipad: No

Links
- Website: www.gentoftehospital.dk

Gentofte Hospital (Copenhagen University Hospital Gentofte) is located in Gentofte within Copenhagen in Denmark. Administratively, it is part of the hospital service of Region Hovedstaden. The hospital primarily serves the municipalities of Gentofte, Lyngby-Taarbæk, and Rudersdal, with a population of about 175,000.

== History ==
The hospital was opened in 1927.

== Facilities and departments ==
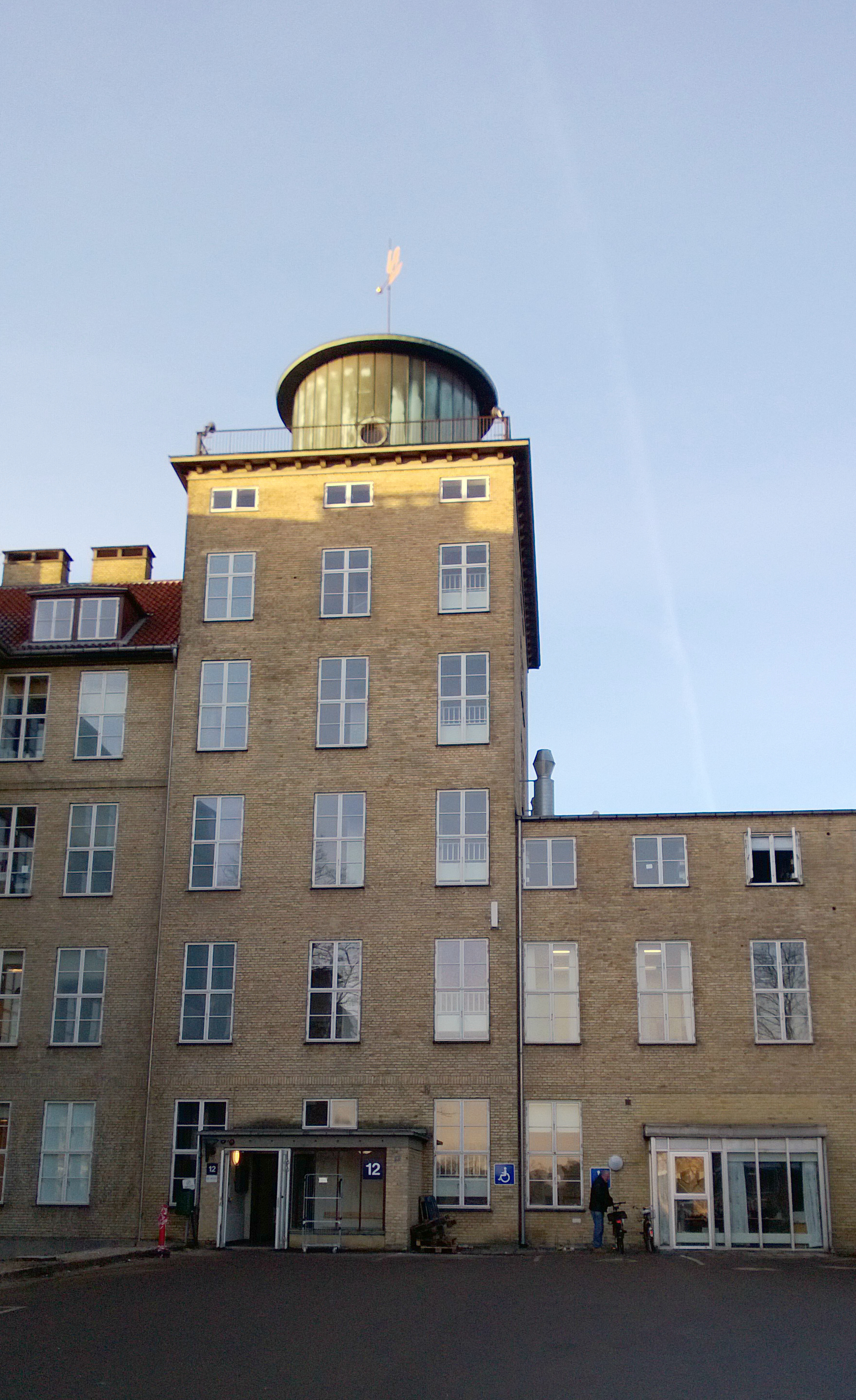

As one of the university hospitals for Copenhagen University (the hospital is also a teaching hospital for medical students from the university), the hospital has extensive research and training facilities. Two large medical departments cover gastroenterology, endocrinology, rheumatology, geriatric medicine and stroke rehabilitation. It also houses dedicated cardiology and pulmonary medicine departments, an ENT department with the largest audiology department in Denmark and a dermatology and allergy unit. The hospital also hosts the regional department for innovations in elective surgery. Additionally, Gentofte Hospital has both a closed and open psychiatric ward.

== See also ==
- Region Hovedstadens Psykiatri for the psychiatric department of the hospital
