= Amager Hospital =

- The Capital Region (Denmark)
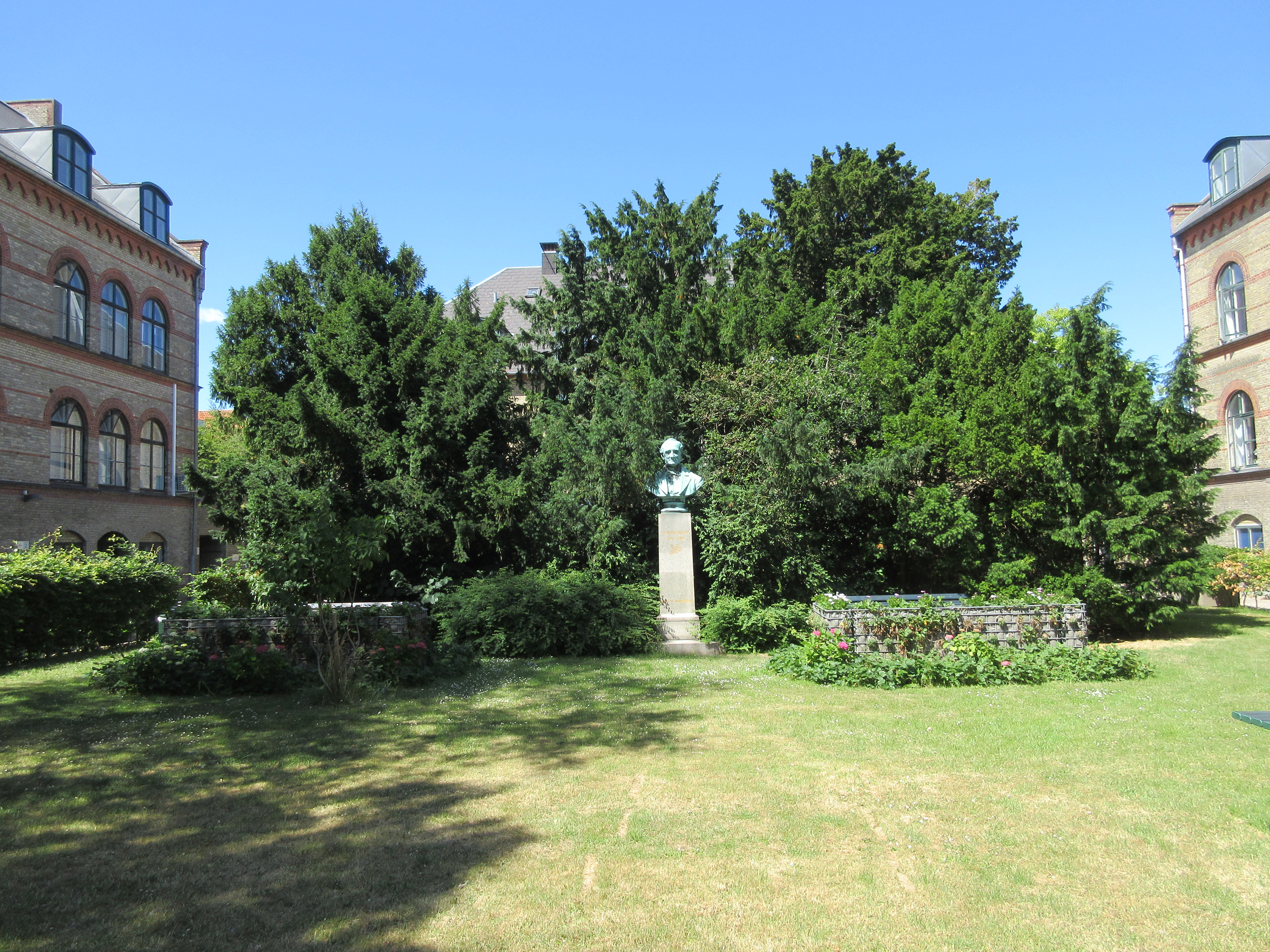
- Bust of Lauritz P. Holmblad in one of the courtyards of Amager Hospital in Copenhagen, Denmark

Geography
- Location: Copenhagen, Capital Region, Denmark
- Coordinates: 55°39′17.63″N 12°37′13.48″E

Organisation
- Type: District, teaching
- Affiliated university: University of Copenhagen

Services
- Emergency department: Yes
- Beds: 685

Helipads
- Helipad: No

History
- Former names: Sundby Hospital; Skt. Elisabeth Hospital
- Founded: 1 April 1997

Links
- Website: www.amagerhospital.dk

Amager Hospital is located in Denmark on the island of Amager in Copenhagen. It was founded on 1 April 1997 with the merger of Skt. Elisabeth Hospital and Sundby Hospital. Administratively, Amager Hospital is maintained by Region Hovedstaden and was merged with Hvidovre Hospital in 2012.

The hospital is a teaching hospital for medical students from the University of Copenhagen as well as nursing students from the region.

== Areas of expertise ==
Amager Hospital specialises in "folk illnesses" and encompasses the following departments within the specialty of internal medicine:

- Cardiology
- Endocrinology
- Geriatrics
- Pulmonology

Additionally, the hospital has a local emergency department (though patients in need of critical care are referred to Hvidovre Hospital and traumas to Rigshospitalet) as well as a clinical biochemistry department.

Amager Hospital does not have a psychiatric department, as this is administratively located under Region Hovedstadens Psykiatri, though physically located at the former Skt. Elisabeth Hospital.
