= Hørsholm Municipality =

Hørsholm Municipality Hørsholm Kommune (Danish)
- Municipality
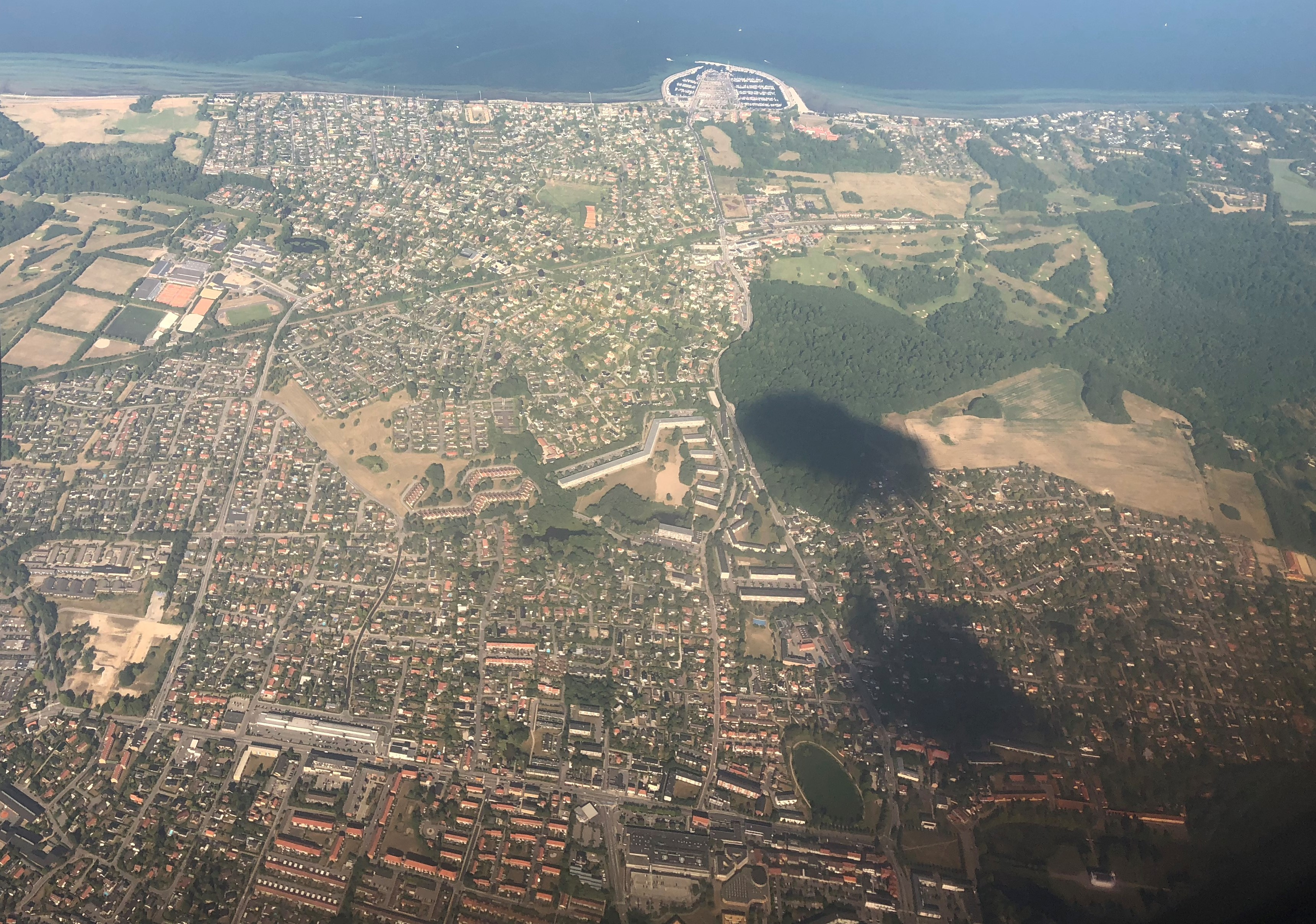

- Coat of arms

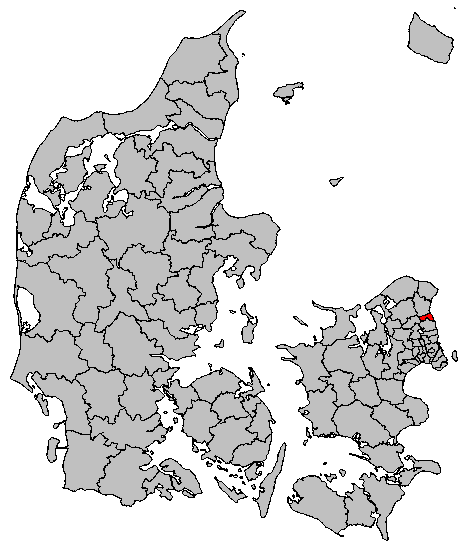
- Location in Denmark
- Coordinates: 55°53′00″N 12°30′00″E
- Country: Denmark
- Region: Hovedstaden
- Established: 1 January 1842

Government
  - Mayor: Morten Slotved

Area
  - Total: 31.30 km^{2} (12.08 sq mi)

Population (1. January 2026)
  - Total: 25,354
  - Density: 810.0/km^{2} (2,098/sq mi)
- Time zone: UTC+1 (CET)
  - Summer (DST): UTC+2 (CEST)
- Website: www.horsholm.dk

Hørsholm Municipality (Danish: Hørsholm Kommune) is a municipality (Danish, kommune) in the Capital Region in the northern part of the island of Zealand (Sjælland) in eastern Denmark. The municipality covers an area of 31 km^{2}, and has a total population of 25,354 (1 January 2026). Its mayor as of 2010 is Morten Slotved, a member of the Conservative People's Party (Det Konservative Folkeparti).

The main town and the site of its municipal council is the town of Hørsholm.

Neighboring municipalities, in line with the Kommunalreformen ("The Municipal Reform" of 2007), are Fredensborg municipality (formerly Fredensborg-Humlebæk and Karlebo) to the north, Allerød municipality to the west, and Rudersdal municipality (formerly Birkerød and Søllerød) to the south. To the east is the Øresund, the strait that separates Denmark from Sweden. The distance to Sweden from the coast at Hørsholm is ca. 17 km to Landskrona or ca. 9 km to the Swedish island of Ven.

Hørsholm and the neighbouring town Rungsted (which is part of Hørsholm Municipality) has an average income per household among the highest in the country - a fact also strongly reflected in the price of housing in the area. Wealthy households are attracted to Hørsholm by its comparatively low income tax rate, proximity to forests and the sea. Moreover, the commuting distance to central Copenhagen remains reasonably short.

The Hørsholm Midtpunkt shopping mall with its 65 stores opened in the early 1970s and is the second largest shopping mall in Northern Zealand and among the ten largest shopping malls in the Copenhagen Capital Region.

Hørsholm municipality was not merged with other municipalities on 1 January 2007 under the nationwide Kommunalreformen ("The Municipal Reform" of 2007).

== History ==
Hørsholm was the site of the infamous Hirschholm Palace, which served as the summer retreat for King Christian VII and his court in 1771, when his consort, Queen Caroline Matilda, gave birth to her child by Johann Friedrich Struensee, Princess Louise Augusta. The castle, referred to as the "Versailles of the North", was neglected after that fateful year and torn down by Frederick VI, the King's son, in order to provide building materials for Christiansborg Palace, which had burned down in 1794.

Hørsholm Church, built in 1832 and designed by Christian Frederik Hansen, is now found on the spot where the castle once stood.

Local museum Hørsholm Egns Museum ("Hørsholm Local Museum") has a display dedicated to the palace and its fate.

== Politics ==
=== Municipal council ===
Hørsholm's municipal council consists of 19 members, elected every four years.

Below are the municipal councils elected since the Municipal Reform of 2007.

Election	Party								Total seats	Turnout	Elected mayor
Election	A	B	C	F	I	O	T	V	Total seats	Turnout	Elected mayor
2005	2	1	7			1	3	5	19	72.2%	Uffe Thorndal (C)
2009	1	2	7	1		1	2	6	19	72.0%	Morten Slotved (C)
2013	2	1	8		1	1	1	5	19	77.1%	Morten Slotved (C)
2017	3	1	8		1	1		5	19	76.7%	Morten Slotved (C)
Data from Kmdvalg.dk 2005, 2009, 2013 and 2017
