= Zealand University Hospital, Roskilde =

Hospital in Roskilde, Denmark

Coordinates: 55°38′11″N 12°05′19″E

Zealand University Hospital, Roskilde (former name Roskilde Sygehus) is the main hospital in Roskilde on the Danish island of Zealand. It should not be confused with Zealand University Hospital, Køge (formerly named Køge Sygehus). Zealand University Hospital, Roskilde was founded in 1855, and as of 2014 it had 437 beds for in-patients and several specialist wards. The hospital has been continuously modernized and expanded over the years. In 2010, physics facilities were established in medical and hematological outpatient units, while the cardiology laboratory was expanded for CAG/PCI. In 2011, a haematological ward and a urological ward were modernized and re-equipped. The hospital works in conjunction with Roskilde University in biomedical research, health services research, research assignments, direct research and pharmaceutical biology. It is also involved in scientific co-operation with the Risø Research Centre.
