= Capital Region of Denmark =

Region of Denmark

Coordinates: 55°56.39′N 12°18′E

Capital Region Region Hovedstaden (Danish)
- Region
- Flag Logo

- Country: Denmark
- Capital: Hillerød
- Largest city: Copenhagen
- Municipalities: 29: Albertslund; Allerød; Ballerup; Bornholm; Brøndby; Copenhagen; Dragør; Egedal; Fredensborg; Frederiksberg; Frederikssund; Furesø; Gentofte; Gladsaxe; Glostrup; Gribskov; Halsnæs; Helsingør; Herlev; Hillerød; Hvidovre; Høje-Taastrup; Hørsholm; Ishøj; Lyngby-Taarbæk; Rudersdal; Rødovre; Tårnby; Vallensbæk

Government
  - Chairperson: Lars Gaardhøj (Social Democrats)

Area
  - Total: 2,568.29 km^{2} (991.62 sq mi)

Population (1 January 2025)
  - Total: 1,930,703
  - Density: 751.746/km^{2} (1,947.01/sq mi)

GDP
  - Total: €174.136 billion (2024)
  - Per capita: €90,226 (2024)
- Time zone: UTC+1 (CET)
  - Summer (DST): UTC+2 (CEST)
- ISO 3166 code: DK-84
- HDI (2022): 0.970 very high · 1st of 5
- Website: www.regionh.dk

The Capital Region of Denmark (Danish: Region Hovedstaden, pronounced [ʁekiˈoˀn ˈhoːð̩ˌstæðˀn̩]) is the easternmost administrative region of Denmark, and contains Copenhagen, the national capital.

The Capital Region has 29 municipalities and a regional council consisting of 41 elected members. As of 1 August 2021, the chairperson is Lars Gaardhøj, who is a member of the Social Democrats party of Denmark.

The Capital Region was established on 1 January 2007 as part of the 2007 Danish Municipal Reform. This reform abolished the traditional counties (Danish plural: amter, singular: amt) and created five regions. As part of this reform, 271 smaller municipalities were merged into larger units, reducing the number of municipalities to 98.

The reform dramatically diminished the power of regional governments while enhancing that of local governments and of the central government in Copenhagen. It was implemented on 1 January 2007.

The Capital Region will merge with Region Zealand on 1 January 2027 to create the Region of Eastern Denmark.

Unlike the former counties (1970–2006) (Danish Amtskommune, literally 'county municipality'), the regions are not municipalities and are thus not allowed to have a coat of arms, only logotypes.

The regions do not collect taxes and are financed primarily through block grants. They are unable to transfer money from one area of expenditure to another, and they must return any unused money to the central government.

== Overview ==
The Capital Region of Denmark is one of five regions in Denmark and consists of the municipalities of Copenhagen and Frederiksberg, the former counties of Copenhagen and Frederiksborg, and the regional municipality of Bornholm. It borders Zealand and Sweden's Skåne County via the Øresund Bridge.

Denmark's largest lake, Arresø, lies 43 kilometres (27 mi) northwest of Copenhagen. The region contains several other lakes, the deepest in Denmark being Furesø, 14.5 kilometers (9 miles) northwest of Copenhagen, which is the namesake of the Furesø Municipality. Among several forests, the region also has the Gribskov forest, which is the namesake of the Gribskov Municipality. The Dyrehaven forest park is just north of Copenhagen (and east of Furesø) in Gentofte Municipality and Lyngby-Taarbæk Municipality.

Geologically, the region lies in the northern part of Denmark, which is rising, or sinking the least, due to post-glacial rebound, turning former inlets and bays into lakes. Arresø is one example, having extended northwest into Kattegat. (The land is rising by 9 millimeters every year in Furuögrund, the northeastern part of Skellefteå Municipality, north of Kvarken.) Because of the mobility of the sand dunes, forests have been planted along the coast of Kattegat in the municipalities of Helsingør, Gribskov, and Halsnæs.

For the purpose of a road and rail connection to Øresund Bridge, land has been added to the island of Amager, which has a tunnel connecting it with the artificial island Peberholm just south of the island of Saltholm. The land area of east Denmark (east of the Great Belt) is approximately 9,622 km^{2} (3,715 sq mi) and is set to increase due to housing projects in the north of Copenhagen Municipality, and also due to new bridges and tunnels being added, such as the Fehmarn Belt Fixed Link and other traffic infrastructure projects. The Copenhagen-Ringsted Line (a high-speed train line) came into operation on 1 June 2019 to increase transport capacity and relieve congestion in Roskilde and the narrow 9-9.5 mile isthmus between Roskilde Fjord and the bay of Køge Bugt. It does this by moving international and national train traffic to the new train line and only keeping local and regional traffic.

The region's primary function and largest expenditure (which takes up around 90% of its budget) is owning and operating the hospitals and healthcare services of the region.

In the east of Denmark, there is one traffic region covered by the public transport agency Movia, which is owned by the Capital Region of Denmark and Region Zealand, and operates in 45 of the 46 municipalities. Because of its remote location, Bornholm has its own traffic company, Bornholms Amts Trafikselskab, also known as BAT.

Likewise, in the east of Denmark, the two regions and 45 of the 46 municipalities make up one sole employment region, with Bornholm being its own employment region. Bornholm also performs other tasks that are normally performed by the regions in the rest of Denmark. The municipality of Bornholm is therefore called Bornholm Regional Municipality. In some respects, the island forms a region of its own.

As Denmark is a unitary state, its "capital region" is not a capital district, but one of several regions of Denmark that happens to contain the national capital.

The region does not include the Ertholmene archipelago which is situated to the northeast of Bornholm.

== Economy ==
The gross domestic product (GDP) of the region was €122.2 billion in 2018, accounting for 40.6% of Denmark's economic output. GDP per capita, adjusted for purchasing power, was €50,000 or 166% of the EU average (excluding the United Kingdom) in the same year. GDP per person employed was 130% of the average. The Capital Region is the wealthiest region of Denmark.

== Demographics ==
Region Hovedstaden population pyramid in 2023

The region is home to 1,930,703 people (as of 1 January 2025).

== Hospitals ==
The Capital Region of Denmark also manages several hospitals:

- Amager Hospital on the island of Amager, Copenhagen
- Bispebjerg Hospital in Copenhagen
- Bornholms Hospital on the island of Bornholm
- Frederiksberg Hospital (closing gradually beginning July 2027, moving to Bispebjerg) in Frederiksberg
- Gentofte Hospital in Gentofte
- Glostrup Hospital in Glostrup
- Herlev Hospital in Herlev
- Hvidovre Hospital in Hvidovre
- Nordsjællands Hospital in Esbønderup, Frederikssund, Hillerød, Elsinore, and Hørsholm
- Region Hovedstadens Psykiatri – psychiatric hospital with many centers around the region
- Rigshospitalet in Copenhagen
- Sct. Hans Hospital in Roskilde

== Transport ==
The region is served by Copenhagen Airport. As the Nordic countries' largest airport, it served close to 30 million passengers in 2024. It is one of the oldest international airports in Europe, the fourth-busiest in Northern Europe, and the busiest for international travel in Scandinavia.

== Municipalities of the Capital Region ==

There are 29 municipalities in the Capital Region of Denmark.

- Copenhagen
- Frederiksberg
- Albertslund
- Allerød
- Ballerup
- Bornholm
- Brøndby
- Dragør
- Egedal
- Fredensborg
- Frederikssund
- Furesø
- Gentofte
- Gladsaxe
- Glostrup
- Gribskov
- Halsnæs
- Helsingør
- Herlev
- Hillerød
- Hørsholm
- Høje-Taastrup
- Hvidovre
- Ishøj
- Lyngby-Taarbæk
- Rudersdal
- Rødovre
- Tårnby
- Vallensbæk

== Regional council ==
The five regions of Denmark each have a regional council of 41 members. Members are elected every four years during local elections. No elections were held in 2025 for the two councils in eastern Denmark that are about to merge from 1 January 2027. These two councils will continue to run their two regions until 1 January 2027, and will then cease to exist. Instead the 47 member council of Eastern Denmark had its first election in the 2025 Danish local elections where 134 cllrs were elected to the four regional councils. The council of eastern Denmark will work on getting the merger of the two regions implemented from 1 January 2027. The council will then start running the new region from 1 January 2027. The next local elections will take place in 2029.

Election	Party												Total seats	Elected chairman
Election	A	B	C	D	F	I	M	O	V	Ø	Å	...	Total seats	Elected chairman
2005	13	5	6		3			3	8	3			41	Vibeke Storm Rasmussen (A)
2009	12	3	6		8			4	6	2			41	Vibeke Storm Rasmussen (A)
2013	13	3	5		2	1		4	8	5			41	Sophie Hæstorp Andersen (A)
2017	13	3	5		3	2		3	6	4	2		41	Sophie Hæstorp Andersen (A)
2021	9	5	10	1	4			1	5	6			41	Lars Gaardhøj (A)
Current; No elections held for the two councils in the regions that will merge 2027	9	5	10	1	4		1	1	3	6		1	41	Lars Gaardhøj (A)
Data from Kmdvalg.dk

== See also ==
- Regions of Denmark
- Municipalities of Denmark
- North Zealand
