= Herlev Hospital =

- The Capital Region (Denmark)
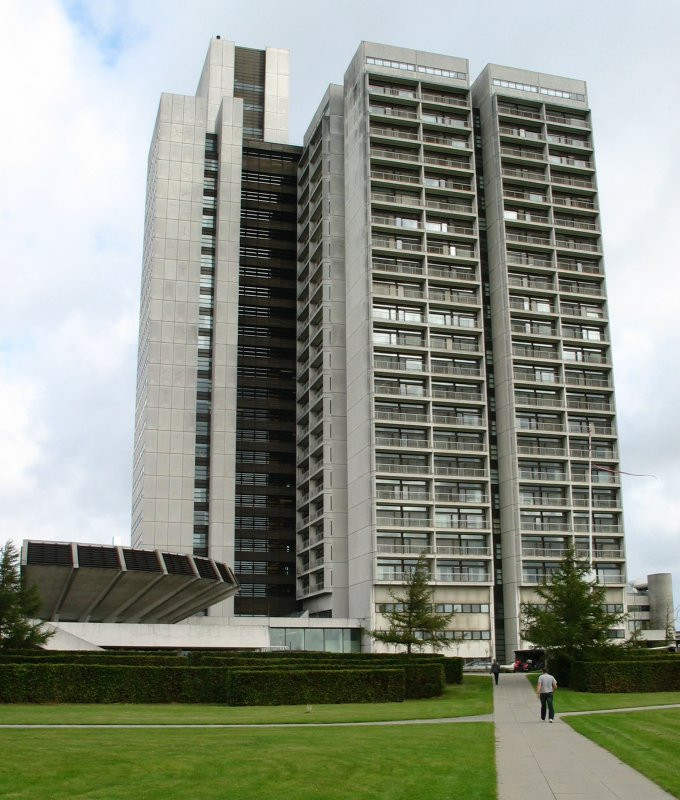

Geography
- Location: Herlev Ringvej 75 2730 Herlev, Capital Region, Denmark
- Coordinates: 55°43′53″N 12°26′37″E

Organisation
- Type: Teaching
- Affiliated university: University of Copenhagen

Services
- Emergency department: Yes
- Beds: 1,616 (2010)

Helipads
- Helipad: No

History
- Founded: 1965

Links
- Website: www.herlevhospital.dk

Herlev Hospital (former Danish: Amtssygehuset i Herlev) is a teaching hospital in Herlev, Denmark, near Copenhagen. The building is 120 metres (390 ft) tall and has 25 floors. It was famous for being Denmark's tallest building, but was surpassed in 2022 by Light House in Aarhus. Its modern, functional architecture in bright concrete, glass and bronze-colored aluminum gives a unique impression.

The building was designed by Gehrdt Bornebusch in collaboration with Max Brüel and Jørgen Selchau. Sven Hansen was the landscape architect while the artistic decoration was done by Poul Gernes.

Its construction began in 1965 and the hospital was completed in 1975. It opened in 1976. The hospital has 1,616 beds (of 2010) and employs about 4,000 people and tends to 82,000 patients annually.

The hospital is a teaching hospital for medical students from Copenhagen University.

The former title Amtssygehuset i Herlev was changed when the Danish Municipal Reform of January 1, 2007 abolished the amter and replaced them with five administrative regions.

In 1987 the hospital was involved in the case of the hospital bombings (Danish: Sygehusbomberne) where an undetonated pipe bomb was found in the hospital.

== Additional images ==
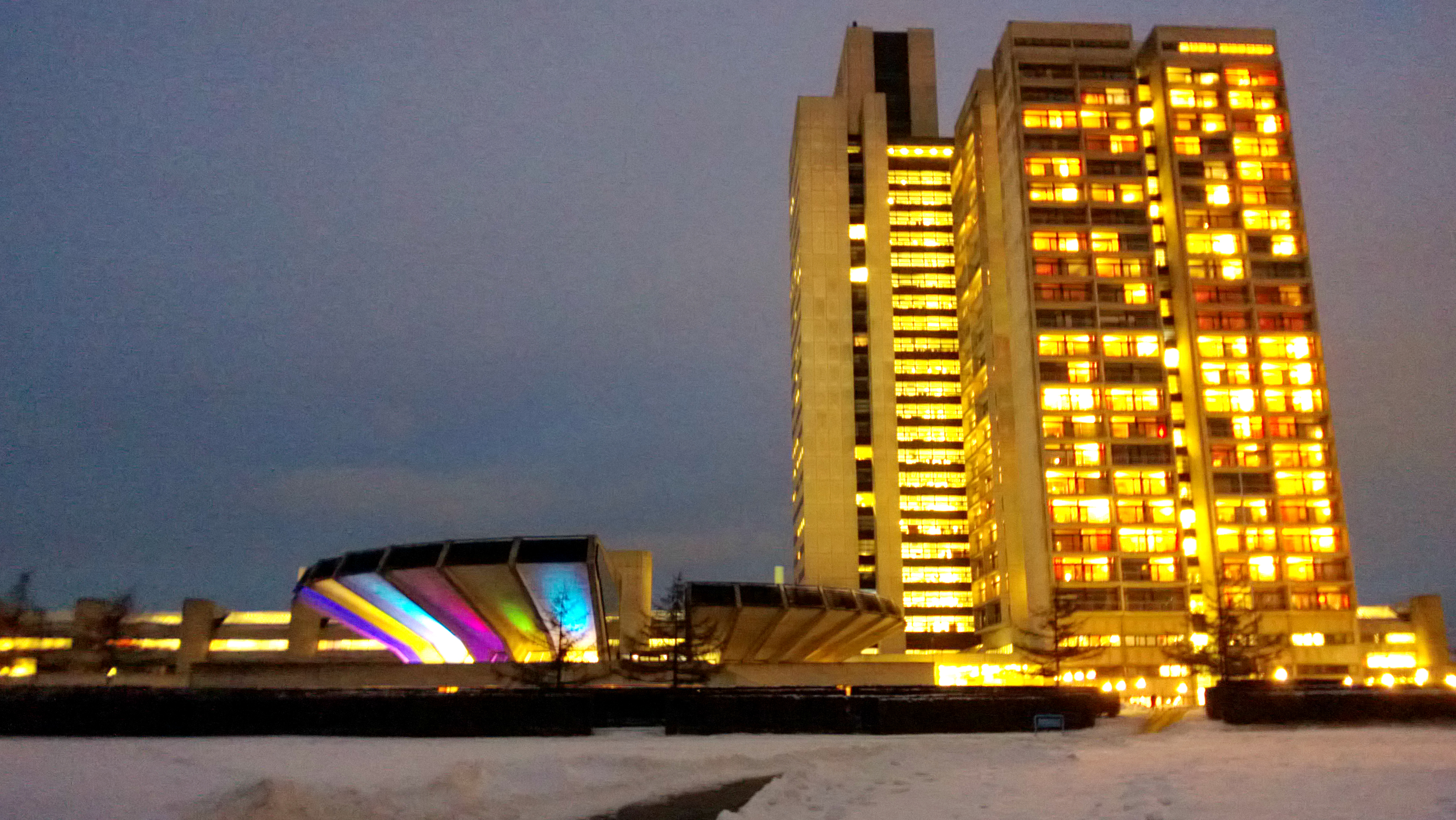
Herlev Hospital from south side a winter evening

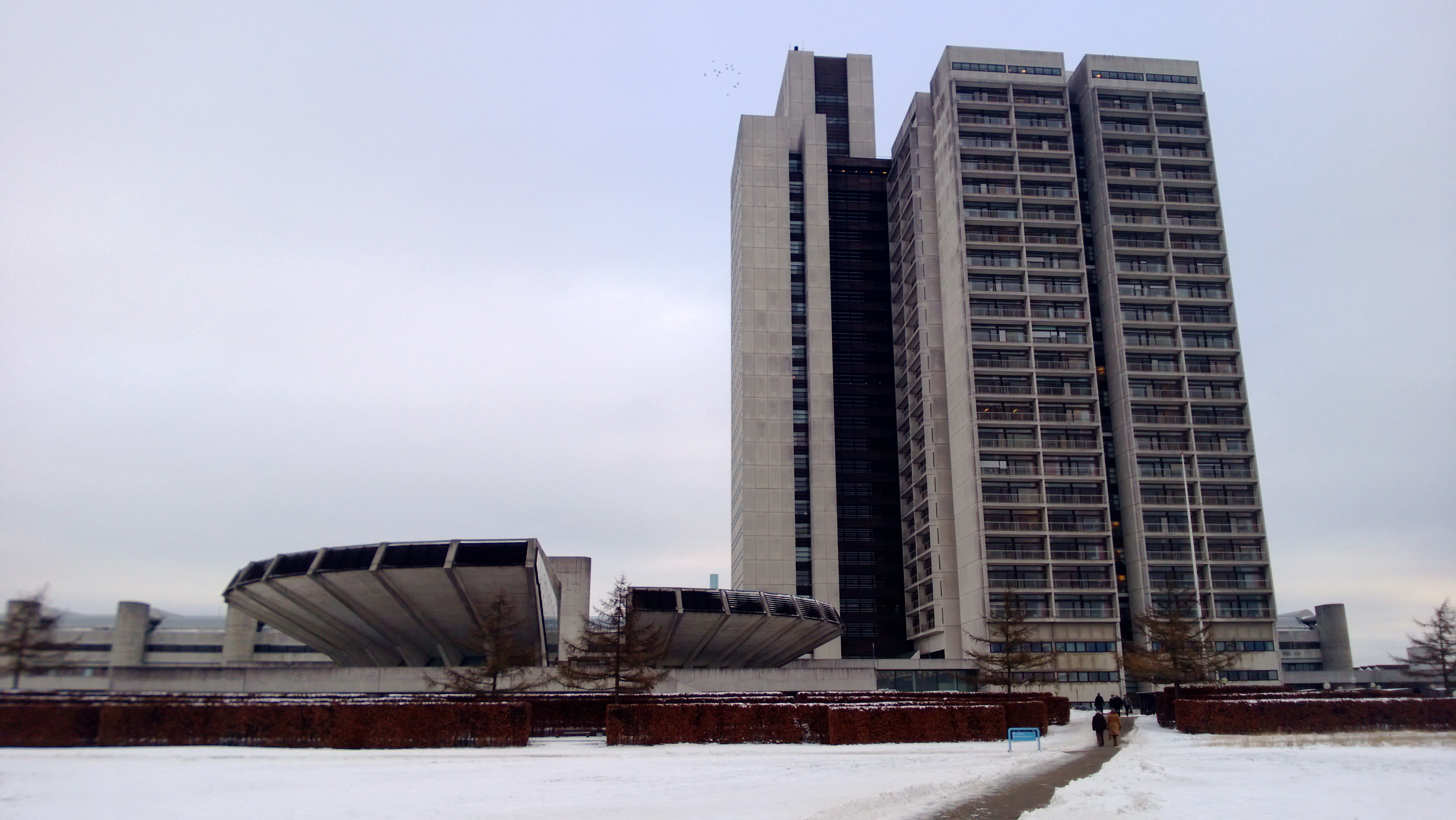
Herlev Hospital from south side during winter

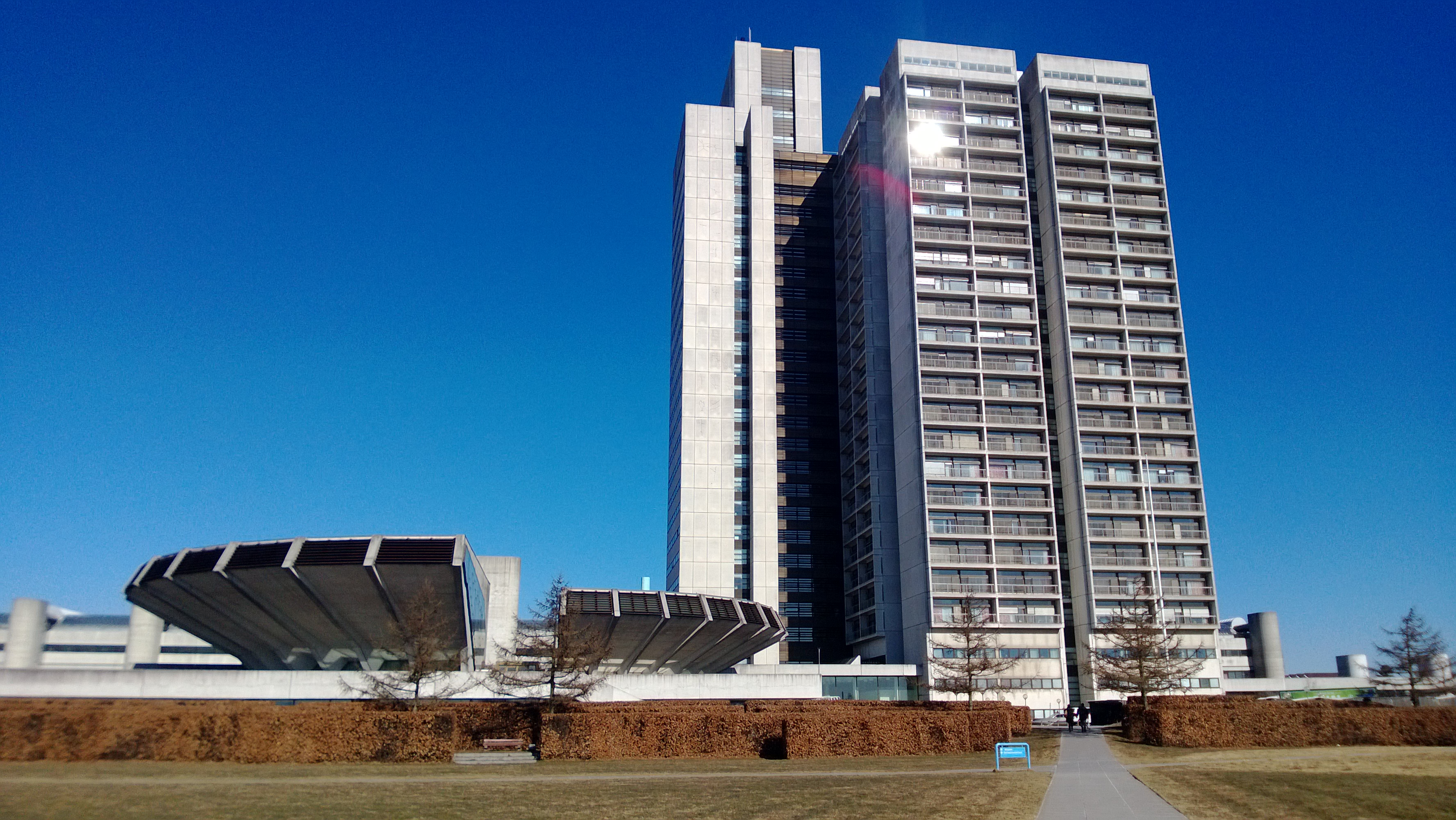
Herlev Hospital from south side during spring

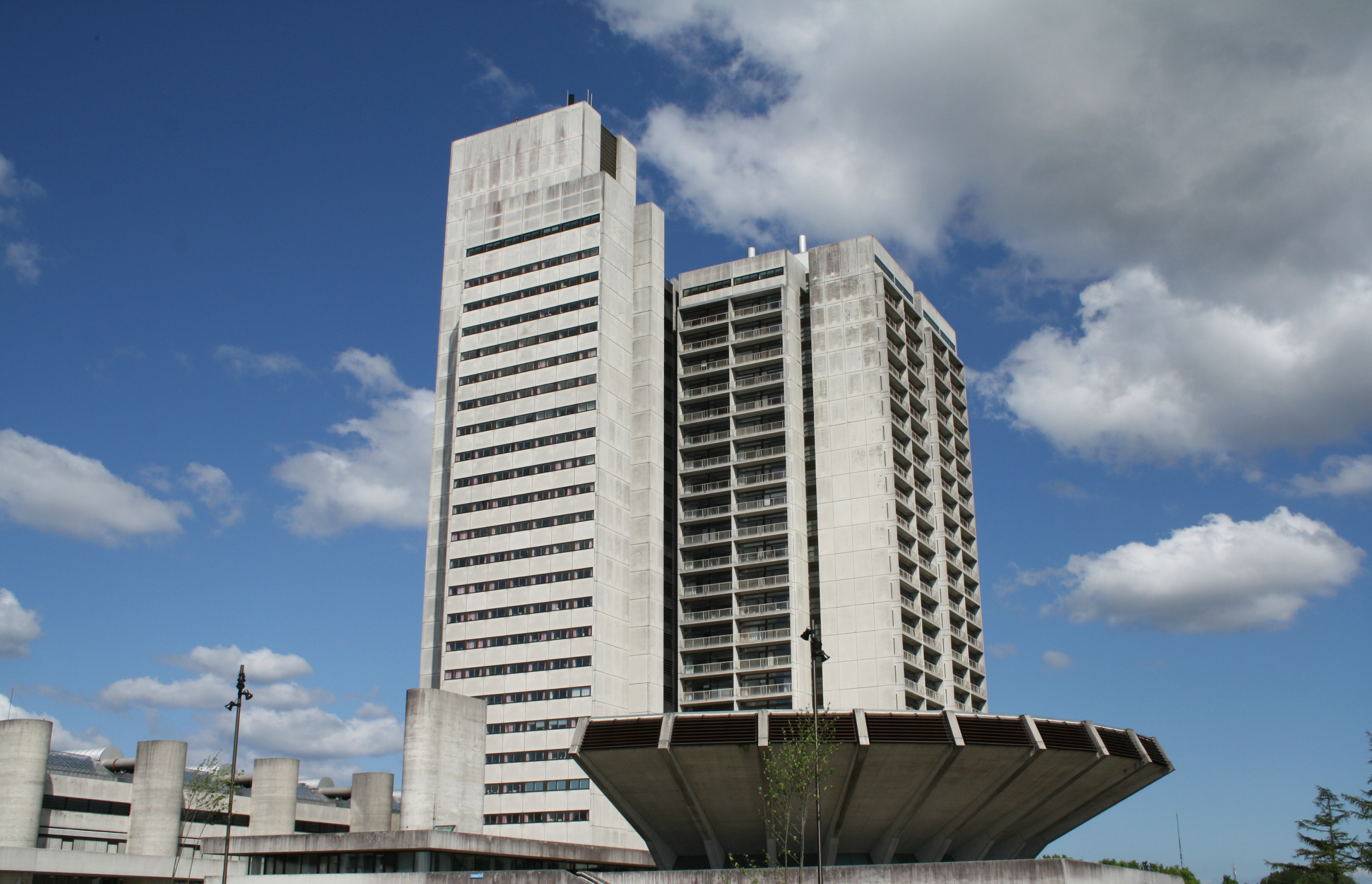
Herlev Hospital seen from South West

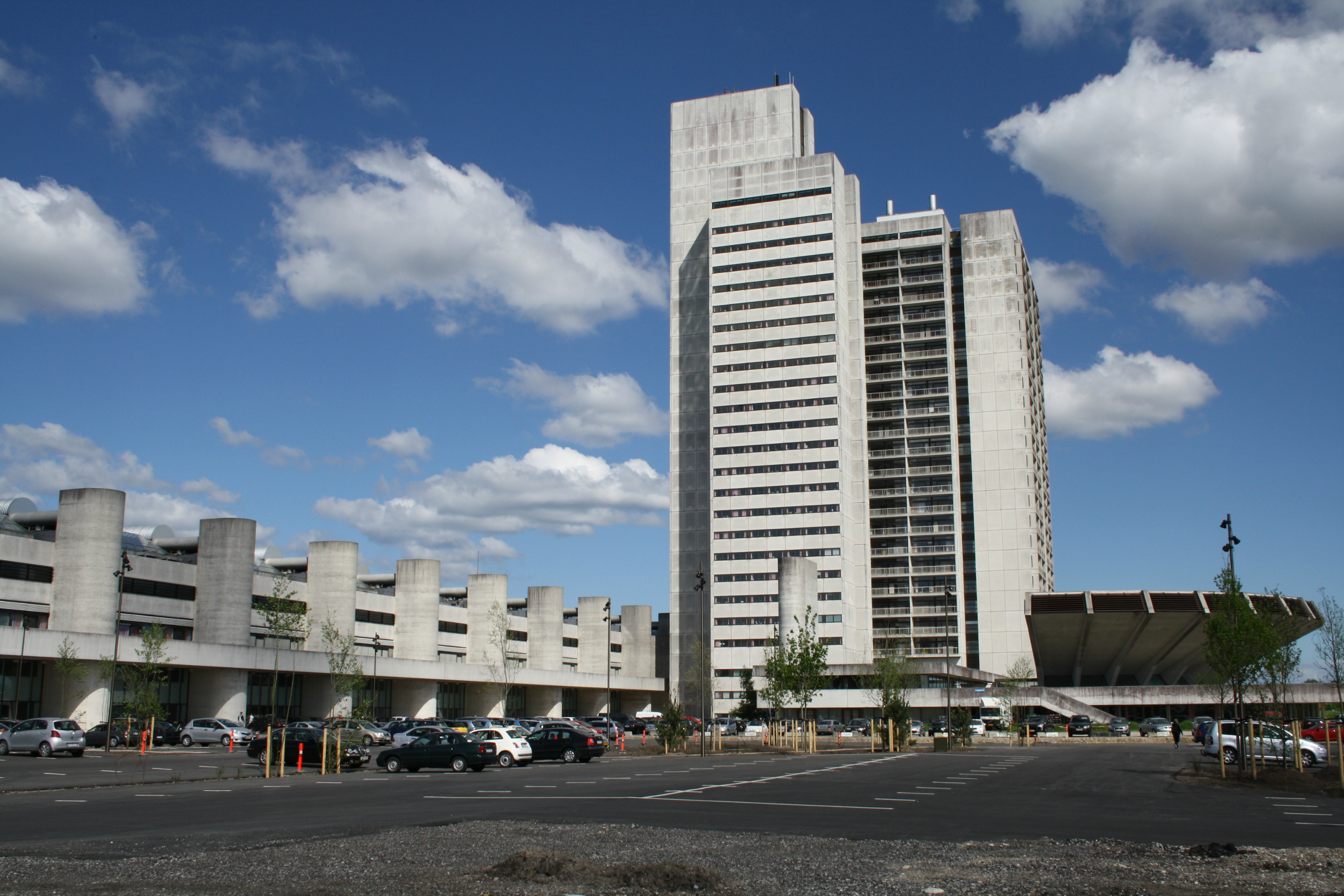
Herlev Hospital seen from West

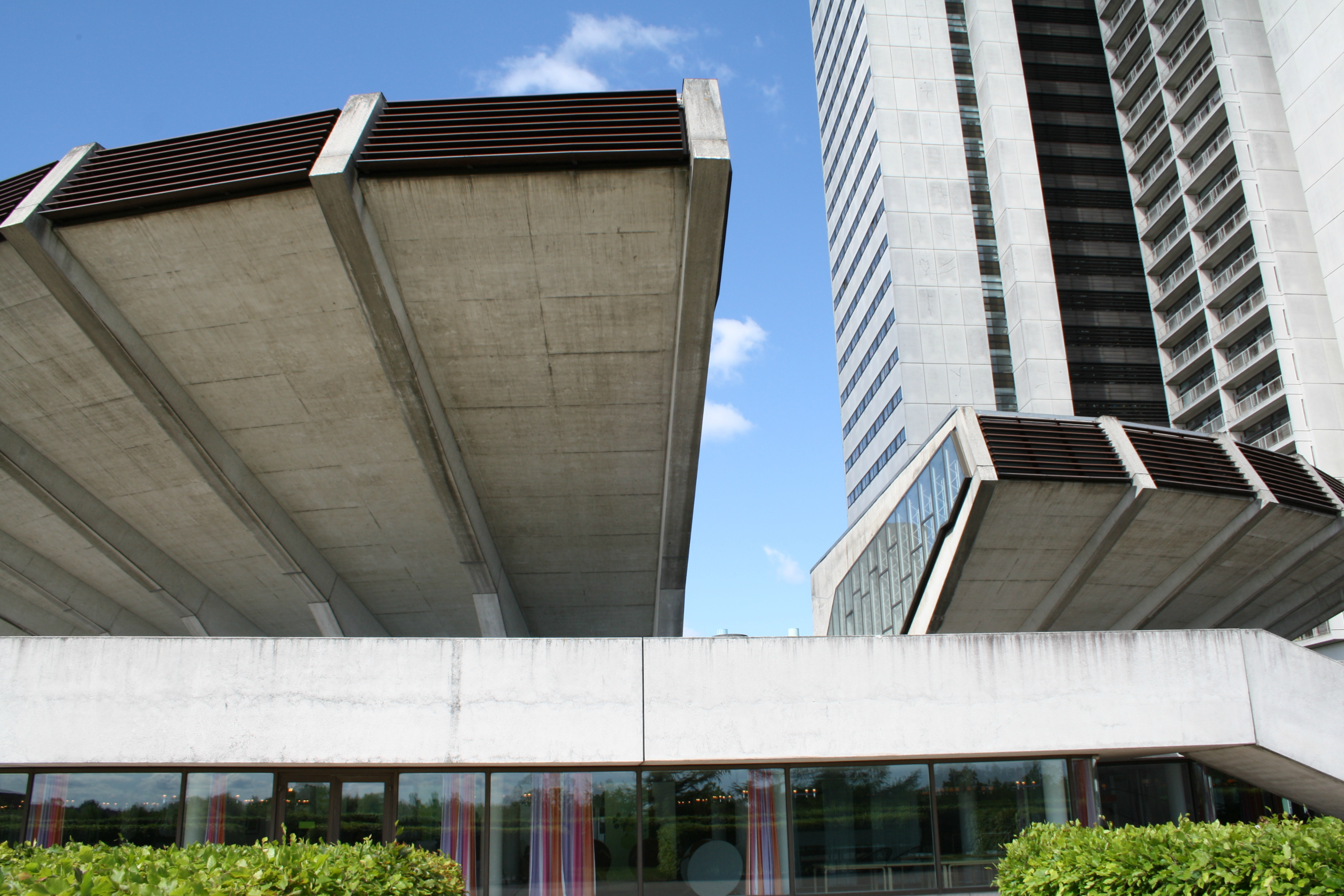
Herlev Hospitals auditoriums seen from South
