= Hvidovre Hospital =

Hospital in Hvidovre near Copenhagen in Denmark

Coordinates: 55°38′54″N 12°27′57″E

- The Capital Region (Denmark)

Geography
- Location: Hvidovre, Capital Region, Denmark

Organisation
- Type: Teaching
- Affiliated university: University of Copenhagen

Services
- Emergency department: Yes

Helipads
- Helipad: No

Links
- Website: www.hvidovrehospital.dk

Hvidovre Hospital is a hospital in Hvidovre near Copenhagen in Denmark. It is administered by the Capital Region of Denmark.

The hospital was built from 1968 to 1979 and was officially opened on March 26, 1976. The hospital stands out for not being built high - the four main buildings are just three stories, whereas the building spans over 300,000 square meters.

Hvidovre Hospital is one of Denmark's largest with more than 40,000 patients admitted each year. It has 35 departments, including Denmark's largest delivery ward with more than 5,500 deliveries a year.

The hospital is a teaching hospital for medical students from Copenhagen University.

== See also ==
- Amager Hospital
