= Bispebjerg Hospital =

Hvidovre Hospital
- The Capital Region (Denmark)
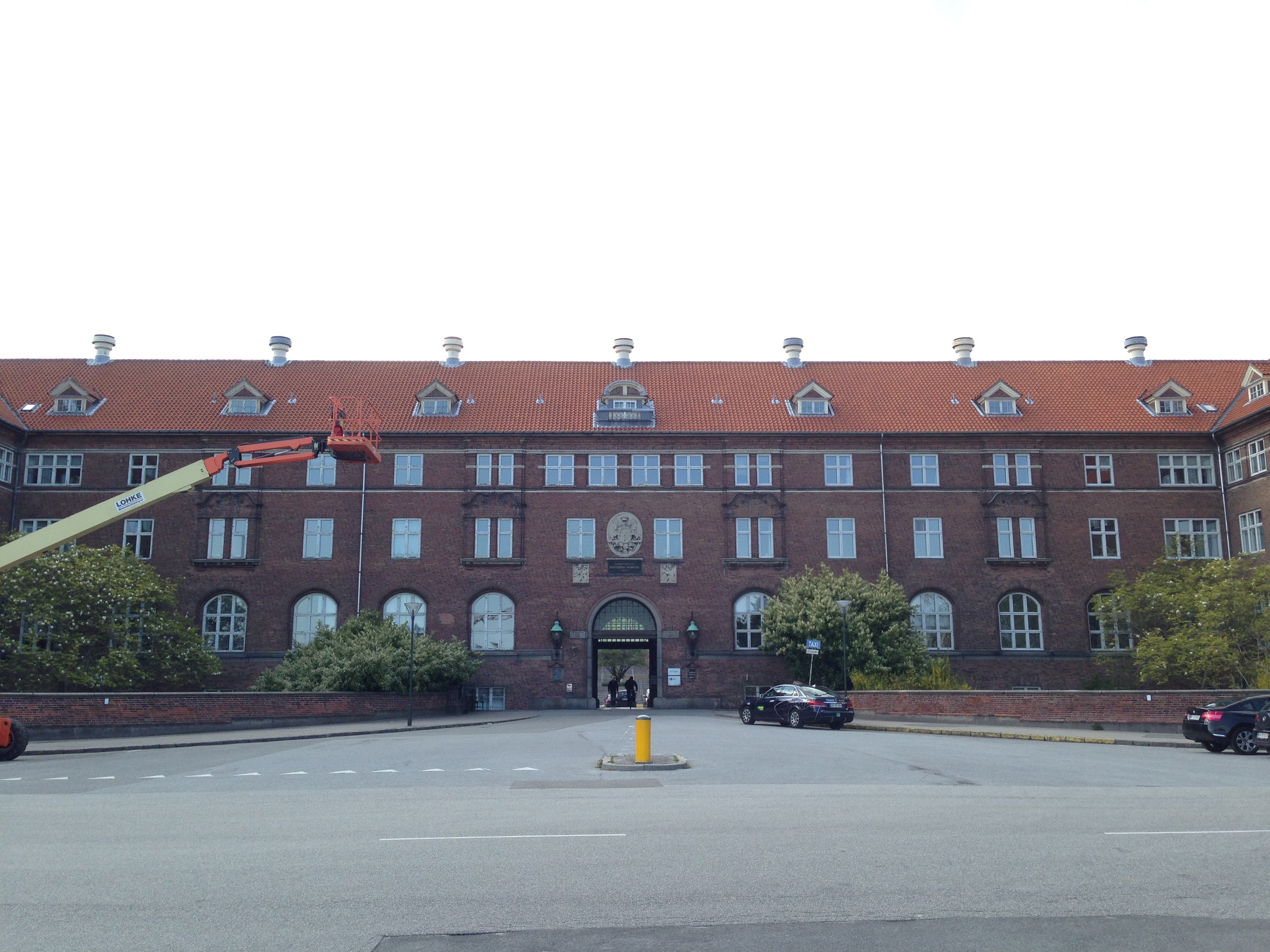

Geography
- Location: Copenhagen, Capital Region, Denmark
- Coordinates: 55°42′44″N 12°32′30″E

Organisation
- Type: Teaching
- Affiliated university: University of Copenhagen

Services
- Emergency department: Yes

Helipads
- Helipad: No

History
- Founded: 1913

Links
- Website: www.bispebjerghospital.dk

Bispebjerg Hospital is one of the hospitals in the Capital Region of Denmark. Along with a number of other hospitals and the University of Copenhagen (the Faculty of Health Sciences), Bispebjerg Hospital forms part of the Copenhagen University Hospital.

The hospital is a teaching hospital for medical students from Copenhagen University.

== Main hospital in the inner city “Byen” ==
Bispebjerg Hospital was built in 1913, and today it is the workplace for 3,000 employees. It is a large hospital with many different specialties, complex patient cases and a diversified group of patients. The hospital serves as community hospital for the inhabitants in large parts of Copenhagen and will henceforward be main hospital for the planning area called “Byen”

== A modern city hospital ==
Bispebjerg Hospital functions as a modern city hospital for 400,000 citizens from the Municipality of Frederiksberg and the larger part of the Municipality of Copenhagen and, at the same time, has to provide special services for an even larger population. Among other things, that means that the hospital will have a larger catchment area, will be managing the shared emergency services, and is expected to be extended through extensive new building. See map over the future catchment area.

== A green oasis in the city ==
Bispebjerg Hospital is situated on the hill Bispebjerg Bakke like a green oasis in the city. From the buildings there is a fine view over the city and the unique green gardens, which were laid out in 1913 when the hospital was built. The hospital is constructed with the original pavilions and some newer buildings that are all connected underground through a large tunnel system.

== Bispebjerg Hospital and international standards ==
Bispebjerg Hospital lives up to international standards for quality development and safety. Since 2002 the hospital has been accredited by the American organization Joint Commission – a non-profit organization established to improve the safety and quality in the care and treatment offered by hospitals internationally.

The present accreditation occurred in April 2008 when the hospital underwent yet another accreditation process.

== Gallery ==
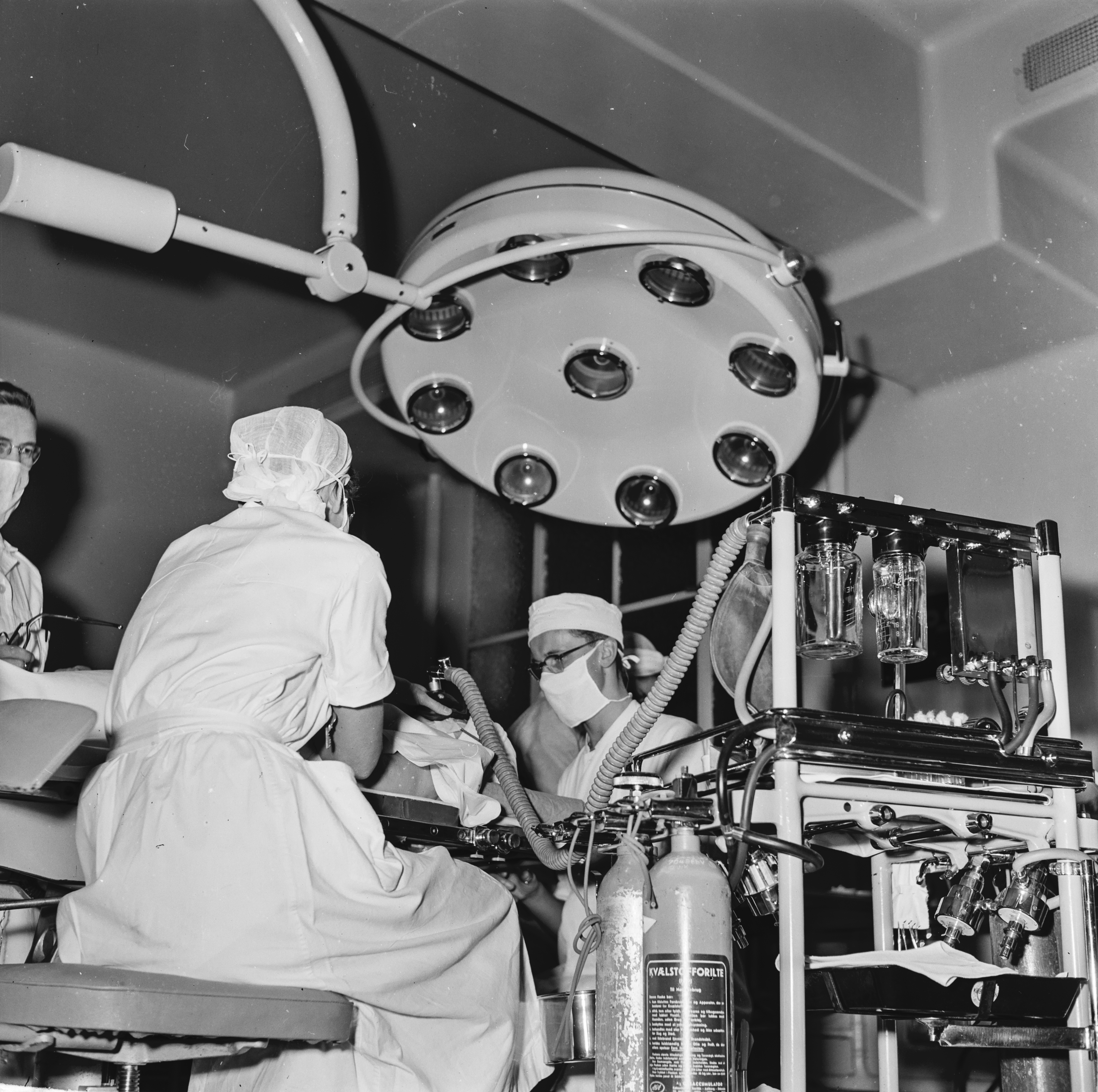
1954

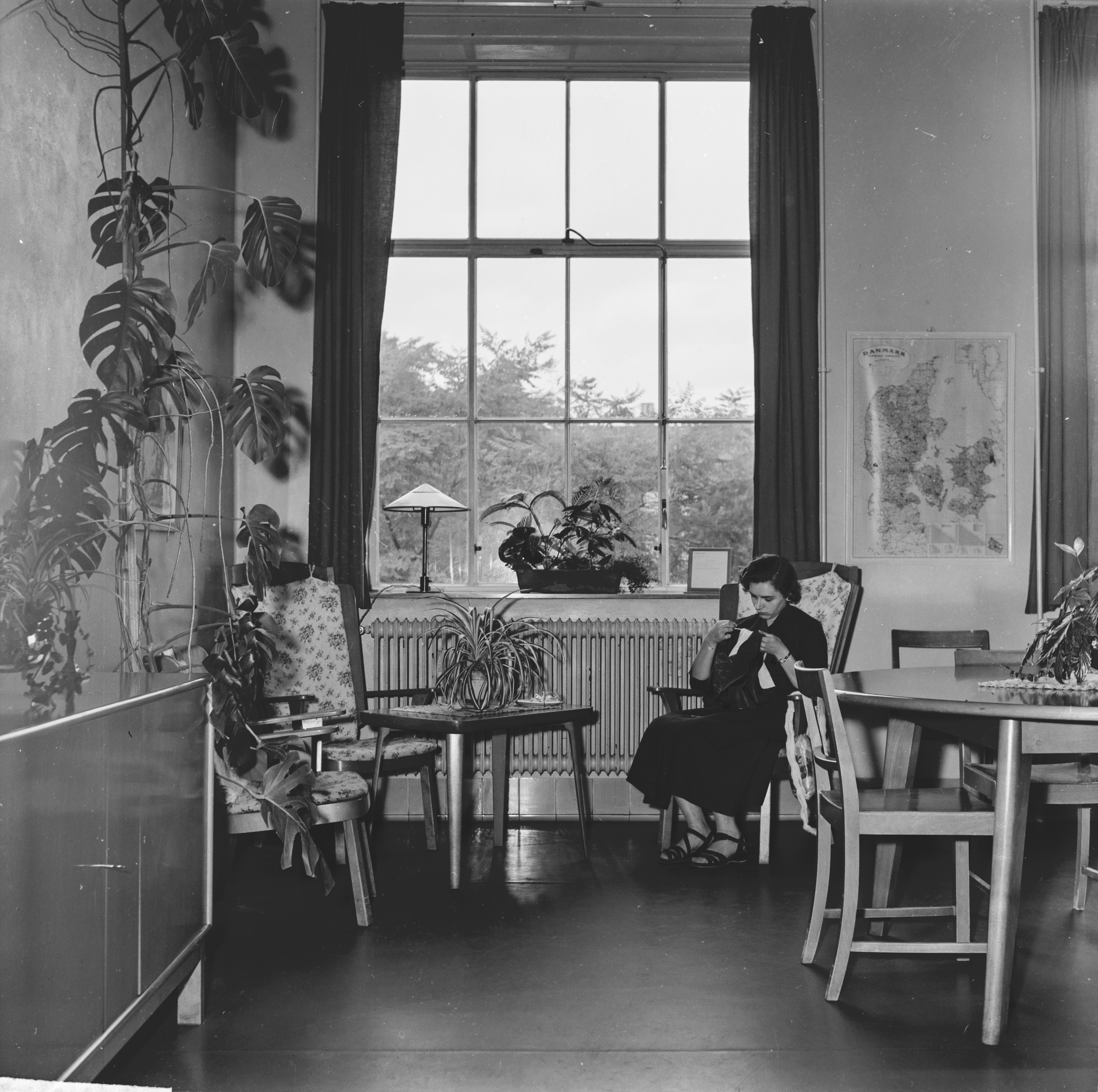
1954

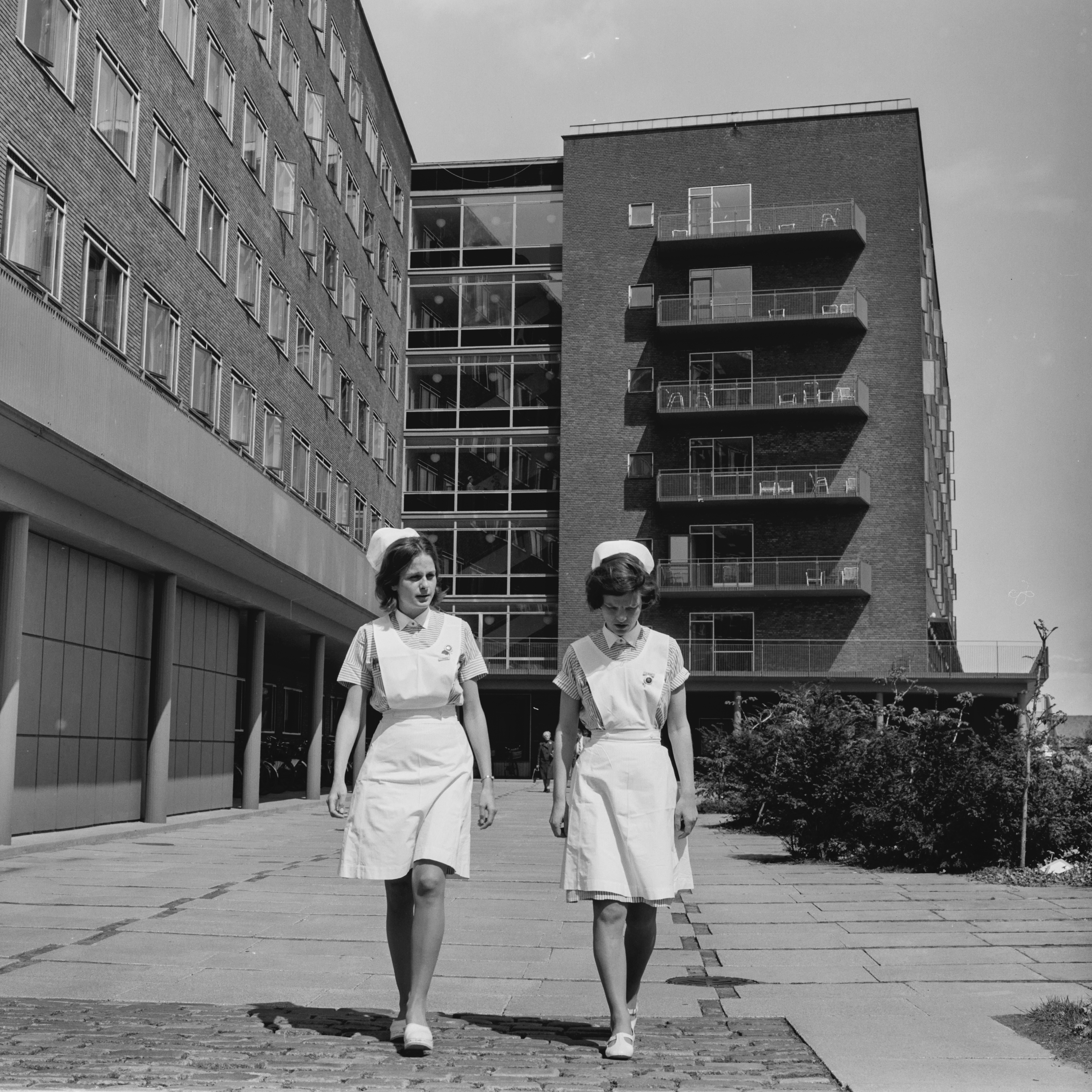
1970

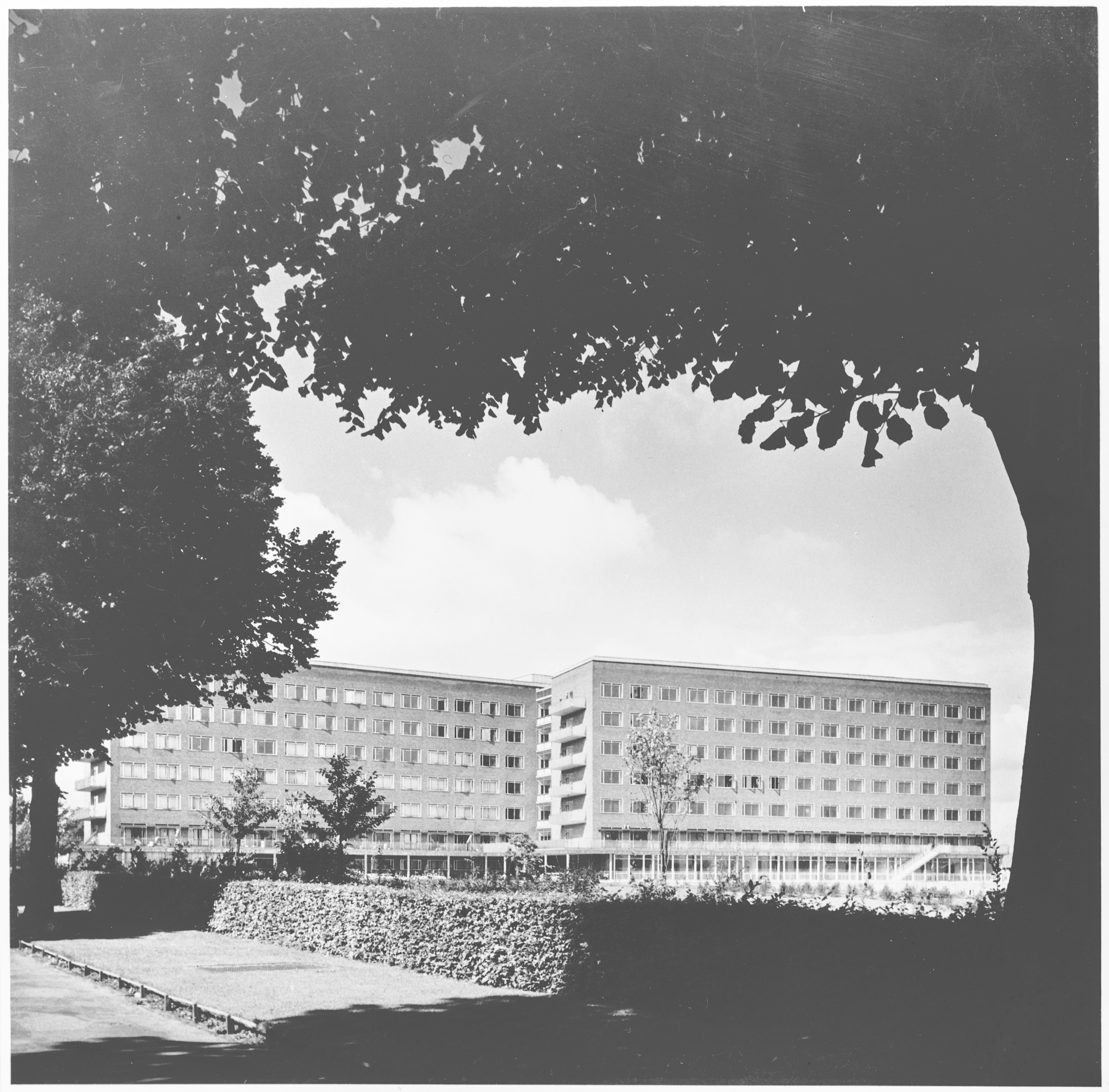
1962
