= The Capital Region (Denmark) =

Coordinates: 55.66°N 12.4°E

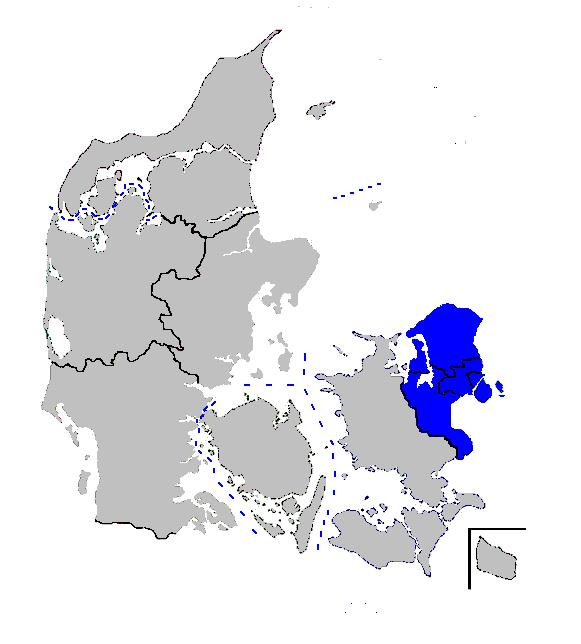
The Copenhagen Metropolitan Area, consisting of Copenhagen City, Outer Copenhagen, Northern Zealand and Eastern Zealand

The Capital Region (Danish: Hovedstadsregionen, pronounced [ˈhoːð̩stæðsʁekiˌoˀnn̩]) was the administrative name of the municipalities of Copenhagen and Frederiksberg and the counties of Frederiksborg, Copenhagen, and Roskilde. It was replaced by the Capital Region of Denmark (Danish: Region Hovedstaden) as an administrative region on 1 January 2007 as part of the 2007 Danish Municipal Reform.

The new region includes the island of Bornholm (in the Baltic Sea 100 nautical miles from Copenhagen), and excludes the southwestern parts of Greater Copenhagen that were covered by Roskilde County. These southwestern areas are instead included in Region Zealand (Danish: Region Sjælland).

== Composition ==
In 2007 the Capital Region had a population of 1,834,492 and an area of 2,861.41 km^{2}

The area consisted of:

Municipality or County	Population	Area (km^{2})	Pop. density (km^{2})
Copenhagen Municipality	503,699	77	6,542
Frederiksberg Municipality (Note: Frederiksberg municipality is an enclave surrounded by Copenhagen municipality. Copenhagen Zoo is located in Frederiksberg municipality, but uses Copenhagen (Danish: København) in its name.)	92,234	8.7	10,516
Copenhagen County	618,518	526	1,170
Frederiksborg County	378,686	1,347	276
Roskilde County	241,523	891	265
Total	1,834,492	2,850	644

== Today ==
The same area has (31 December 2012) 1,937,450 inhabitants (680 inhabitants/km^{2}) However the Capital Region has been expanded and Stevns Municipality has been added. That area is 3030 km^{2} and has 1,957,611 inhabitants (646 inhabitants/km^{2}).

The Capital Region is still in use at several levels:

- Local public traffic, ticket fare zones (Metro, S-train, Local trains, Regional trains within the area, busses etc.)
- Television – three regional TV-channels broadcast over the entire area
- The area is a region for Vejdirektoratet, the Danish motorway & road maintenance authority
- It is also a region of the Danish national rail, DSB. If for instance buying a ticket in Jutland, the ticket is valid for any station within the Capital Region.
- Public identification, people that live within its boundaries usually identify themselves as inhabitants of the Capital Region.
