= Rigshospitalet Glostrup =

- The Capital Region (Denmark)
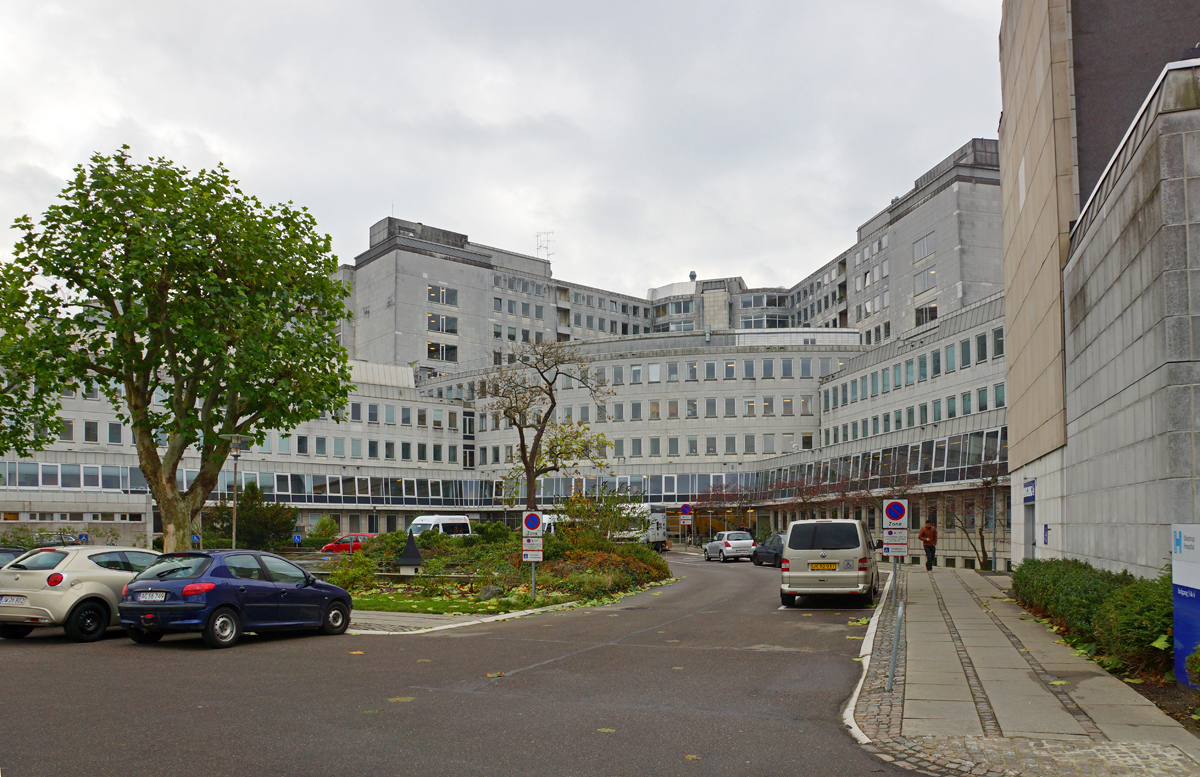
- Rigshospitalet Glostrup main entrance

Geography
- Location: Glostrup, Capital Region, Denmark
- Coordinates: 55°40′12″N 12°23′21″E

Organisation
- Type: Teaching
- Affiliated university: University of Copenhagen

Services
- Emergency department: Yes

Helipads
- Helipad: No

Links
- Website: www.rigshospitalet.dk

Rigshospitalet Glostrup is hospital located in the township of Glostrup, 8 km from the center of Copenhagen in Denmark. It is owned and managed by the regional health authority of the Greater Copenhagen region, Region Hovedstaden. The hospital was formerly known as Glostrup Hospital, but after the merger with Rigshospitalet 1/1/2015, it is now known as Rigshospitalet Glostrup.

A teaching hospital for students of multiple vocations, Rigshospitalet Glostrup is affiliated with the University of Copenhagen and more than 200 of its employees hold academic posts at the university, including 14 professorial chairs.

It is the primary hospital for the 165,000 citizens of the townships of Albertslund, Ishøj, Høje-Taastrup, Glostrup, and Vallensbæk and as a secondary referral center for larger parts of Region Hovedstaden in neurosurgery, clinical neurophysiology, neurology, and occupational medicine. Several high-profiled subspecialized clinical centers with research activities are incorporated in the departments of the Glostrup Hospital, including the Danish Headache Center.

Annual visits number 230,000 patients, including 40,000 in-patients, and 18,000 surgical procedures. With 3,200 employees, 512 beds, Eastern Denmark's largest emergency department and the country's largest ophthalmology department, the Glostrup Hospital is currently undergoing expansion and reorganization to make it a regional and national center in selected specialties while continuing to serve the local community as a general hospital.

Architecturally, Rigshospitalet Glostrup is renowned as an example of new public institutions built in the first decades after World War II. Built from the ground in 1952-1958 after an international competition won by architects Martta Martikainen-Ypyä, Ragnar Ypyä, and Veikko Malmio, the hospital was officially inaugurated September 2, 1958 by king Frederik IX of Denmark.
