= Rigshospitalet =

Hospital in Copenhagen, Denmark

- Capital Region of Denmark

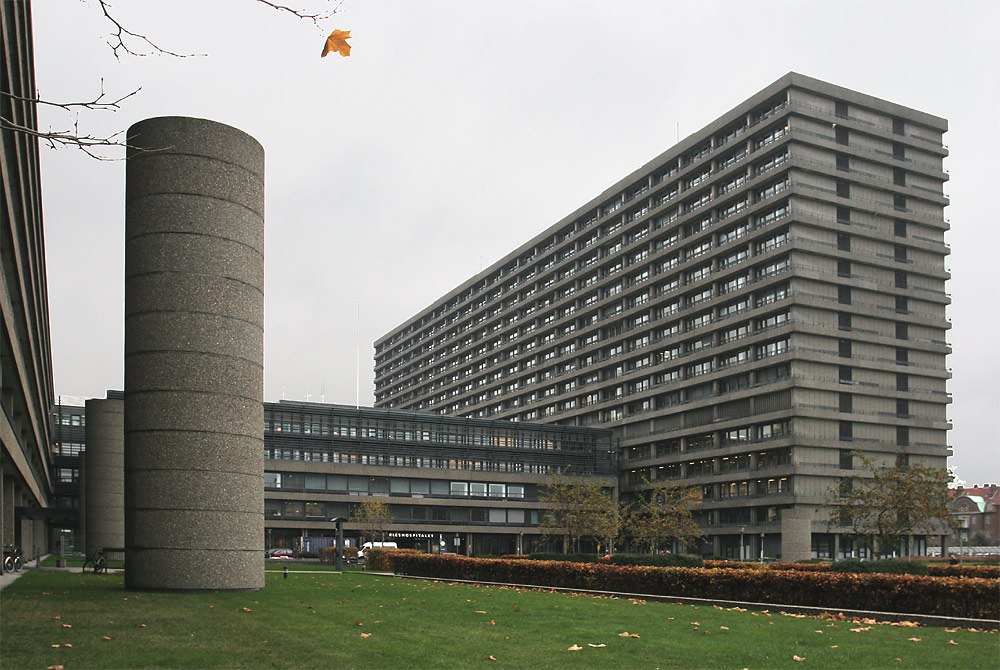
- Rigshospitalet in November 2005

Geography
- Location: Copenhagen, Capital Region, Denmark
- Coordinates: 55°41′48″N 12°34′00″E

Organisation
- Type: Teaching
- Affiliated university: University of Copenhagen

Services
- Emergency department: Yes
- Beds: 1,135

Helipads
- Helipad: Yes

History
- Founded: 30 March 1757

Links
- Website: www.rigshospitalet.dk

Rigshospitalet (meaning the National, State, Kingdom or Hospital of the Realm, but not usually translated) is the largest public and teaching hospital in Copenhagen and the most highly specialised hospital in Denmark. The hospital's main building is a 16-storey functionalist highrise, one of the tallest structures in the central parts of the city. Rigshospitalet neighbours the Panum Building which houses the Faculty of Health and Medical Sciences at the University of Copenhagen. As a teaching hospital it is part of the framework organisation Copenhagen University Hospital.

== Name ==
The Danish name is not usually translated to English. The prefix Rigs- is used in the names of some Danish state institutions, especially in a solemn or prestigious context or for authorities serving for the whole Danish Realm including Greenland and the Faroe Islands. It is the genitive of rige ('realm, kingdom, empire') and the cognate word is used similarly in Norwegian, Swedish, Icelandic and Dutch (and in German until 1945). The prefix Stats- ('of the state') is more widely used, but implies a slightly lower level in the hierarchy. Although Rigshospitalet was founded as a state hospital, as opposed to the normal hospitals operated by counties, the Danish term Statshospital was until 1977 used only for psychiatric institutions.

The hospital itself explains the name was given because its predecessor, Royal Frederick's Hospital, was handed over to the state and became open to patients from the whole Danish Realm.

Rigshospitalet is often abbreviated RH and colloquially also called Riget (literally meaning 'the realm' or 'the kingdom'), hence the name of von Trier's thriller TV series The Kingdom which was set at the hospital, and Stephen King's American version Kingdom Hospital.

== History ==
Rigshospitalet was founded on 30 March 1757 as Kongelig Frederiks Hospital, named after King Frederick V and situated in Bredgade in central Copenhagen. The buildings are now occupied by the Danish Museum of Art & Design. Since 1903 the state has been the owner of the hospital (whereas other hospitals in Denmark are owned by the regions, formerly by the counties). In 1910 the hospital was renamed and moved to its present location in ten low buildings surrounding a central garden designed by architect Martin Borch. In 1970 most of the buildings were replaced by the present highrise concrete building designed by architect Jørgen Stærmose, while some of the surrounding older buildings still serve hospital functions. In 1995 the hospital was handed over to Hovedstadens Sygehusfællesskab (HS, The Capital Hospital Trust) which in 2007 was absorbed by the Capital Region. In 2007 a helipad was built on top of the hospital. Until then, rescue helicopters and helicopters transferring patients would land in the neighbouring park Fælledparken.

In 2021 Rigshospitalet was ranked as the world's 15th best hospital by Statista and Newsweek.

== Key figures ==
As of 2021, some key figures at Rigshospitalet are:

Key figures	Value
Inpatients (in process)	75,182
Physical Attendance (Not Hospitalized)	1,147,276
Virtual contacts (telephone, email, video consultations)	371,659
Operations	64,653
Births	5,790
Bed days	344,254
Average length of stay, days	4.63
Unique patients	354,629
Number of standardized beds, incl. patient hotel	1,135

== Services ==
Rigshospitalet's mission is to be Denmark's leading hospital for patients needing highly specialized treatment. Its main specialist role has been enhanced in recent years by the decision that it should serve as the host institution for many of Copenhagen's speciality departments. Because of this, other hospitals refer patients to Rigshospitalet for the unique expertise available there.

Rigshospitalet's neighbor, the Panum Building, houses the University of Copenhagen's Faculty of Health and Medical Sciences. This proximity optimizes a close cooperation between the two in the fields of research and development. The Nordic Cochrane Centre and the University Centre for Nursing and Care Research are in Rigshospitalet.

With 1,120 beds, Rigshospitalet has responsibility for 65,000 inpatients and approximately 420,000 outpatients annually. In addition to its 8,000 personnel (7,000 full-time equivalents), the hospital trains, hosts, and has the in-service advantages of students of medicine and other health care sciences, as well as scientists working within Rigshospitalet under a variety of research grants.

Rigshospitalet has a trauma centre specialised at receiving severely injured patients. Ordinary emergency department treatment has been relegated to the other hospitals in Copenhagen.

== Social and cultural significance ==
The hospital is the location of Lars von Trier's three-season television horror mini-series The Kingdom.

Queen Margrethe II's children, Frederik X and Prince Joachim, were both born at Rigshospitalet (though the Queen had intended to give birth to her firstborn at Amalienborg Palace but had to be transferred to Rigshospitalet where Frederik was delivered by emergency C-section). Likewise, Frederik's four children, Crown Prince Christian, Isabella, Vincent and Josephine, and Joachim's four children, Nikolai, Felix, Henrik and Athena, were all born there.

== Blood contamination ==
Two patients were infected with HIV at Rigshospitalet in February 2007 after getting a blood transfusion with infected blood. The blood had been tested for antibodies, where HIV infections in the very earliest phase potentially can be overlooked. The contagion could, according to experts, probably have been discovered if the blood had been tested with the newer nucleic acid test, which since 2009 is a requirement.

== Images ==
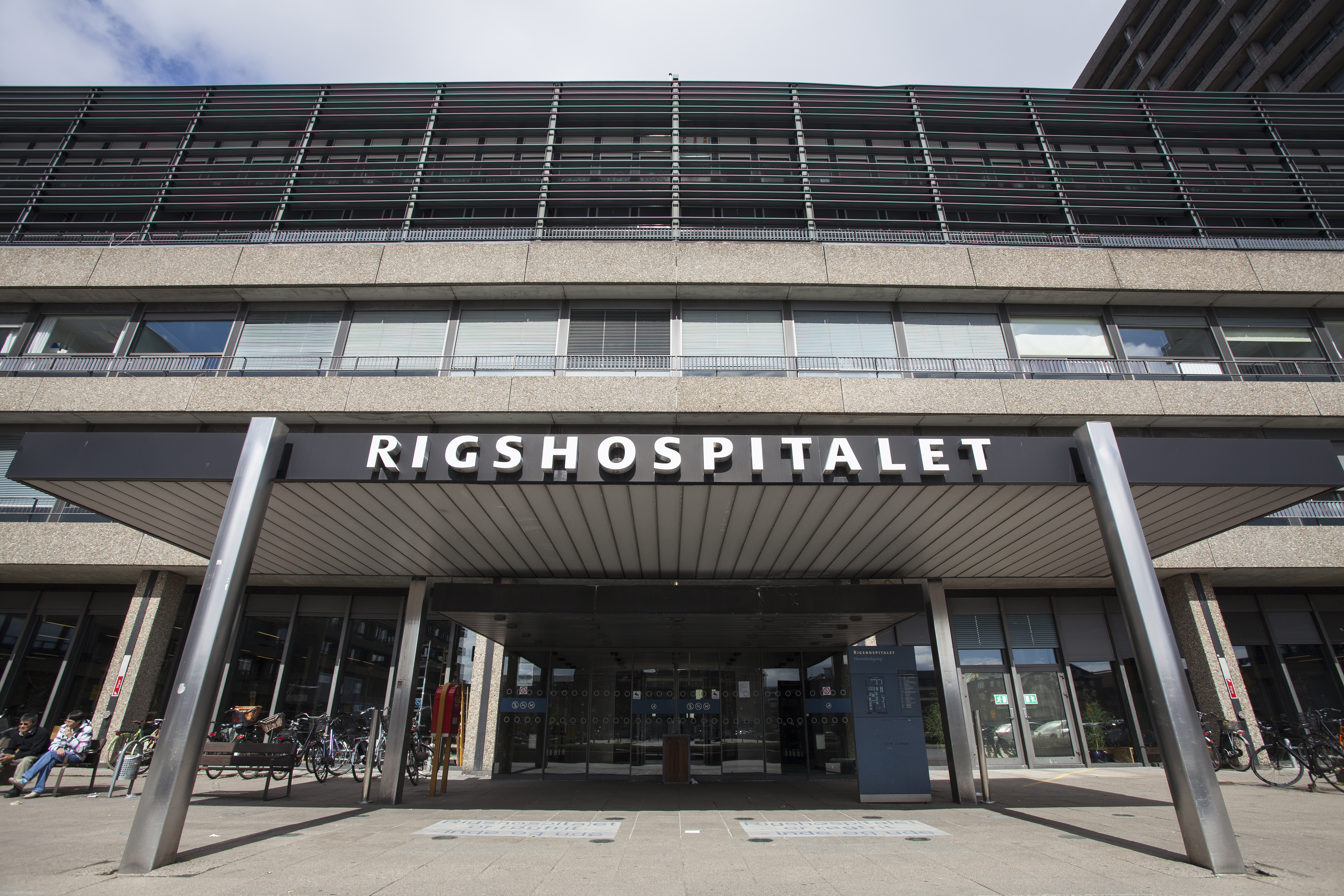
Main entrance

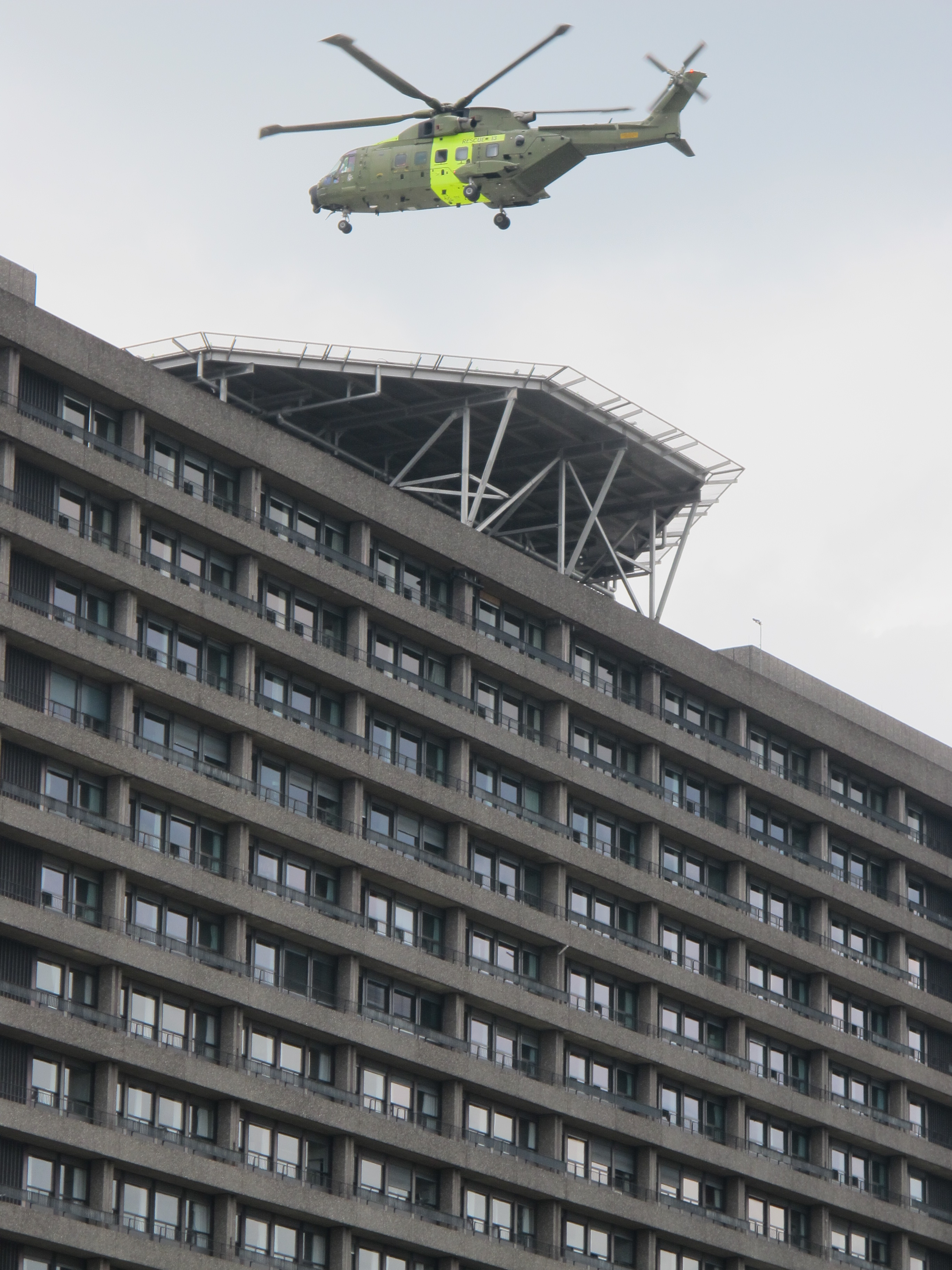
EH101 helicopter takeoff from helipad

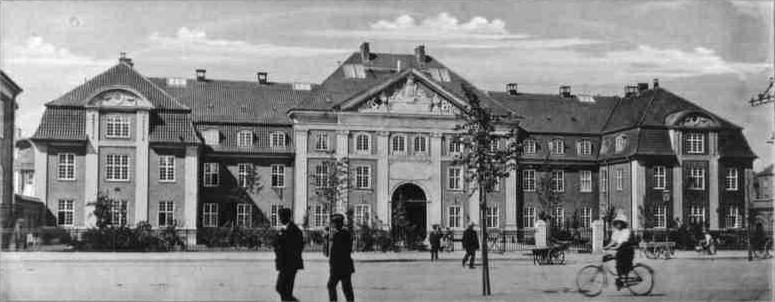
Rigshospitalet in 1910

== See also ==
- Aarhus University Hospital – the largest hospital in Denmark
- Rikshospitalet – a hospital in Norway with a similar function and name
