= List of festivals in Denmark =

This is a list of festivals and carnivals in Denmark.

== By type ==
=== General ===
- Aalborg Carnival
- Aarhus Festuge, largest cultural festival in Northern Europe including several smaller festivals.
- Aarhus Pride
- Copenhagen Carnival
- Copenhagen Christmas Festival
- Copenhagen Light Festival
- Copenhagen Opera Festival, Copenhagen
- Copenhagen Pride
- Cultural Harbour, Copenhagen
- Culture- and Light Festival Lønstrup
- Danish Bridge Festival, Svendborg
- Esbjerg Festival Week
- Exercise Festival, Torup
- Fantasy Festival, Esbjerg
- Farsøfest, Farsø
- Free BunkerLove Festival, Løkken
- Funen MC Festival, Odense
- Geopark Festival, Odsherred Municipality
- Hans Christian Andersen Festival Plays, Odense
- Hillerød Music and Theatre Festival
- Himmelstorm Festival, Hundested
- International Living Theatre (ILT), Aarhus
- International Sand Sculpture Festival, Søndervig
- Kolding Light Festival
- Krudtværks Festival, Frederiksværk
- MADE Festival, DIY and co-creation festival in Roskilde
- Mythological ART Festival, Jelling
- Nordic Ink Festival, tattoo festival in Frederikshavn
- Odense Flower Festival
- PASSAGE, international street theatre festival in Helsingør
- Ribe Wine Festival
- Rose Festival, Bogense
- Samsø Sustainability Festival
- Sandsculpture festival, Hundested
- Shakespeare Festival at Hamlet's Castle, Helsingør
- Shark Cutter Festival and Regatta, Nysted
- Skagen Winter Swimming Festival
- Skarresø Festival (Danmarks Byggefestival)
- Søndervig Winter Swimming Festival
- Street Art Festival, Brande
- Tavern Festival, Helsingør
- The Cimbri Festival, Aars
- Triangle Festival Week, East Jutland. Cultural festival around Vejle, Fredericia and Kolding including several smaller festivals.
- Wadden Sea Festival
- WE Aart Festival, Aalborg
- Wondercool, Copenhagen
- Wool Festival Saltum

=== Historical ===
- Black Powder Festival, Hals
- European Medieval Festival, Horsens
- Knights' Festival at Ulvsborg, at Ulvsborg Historical Center in Asnæs
- Medieval Festival at Spøttrup
- Moesgård Viking Moot, Aarhus
- Nysted Medieval Festival and Market
- Renaissance Festival, Kronborg Castle in Helsingør
- Ringsted Medieval Festival
- The Festival of Centuries, Aarhus
- Viking Festival, changing locations arranged by National Museum Denmark

=== Food ===
- Cod Festival, Nakskov
- Copenhagen Beer Festival
- Copenhagen Cooking and Food Festival
- EAT!, Odense
- Food Festival Aarhus
- Fra Bund Til Mund
- Harvest Festival in Asnæs
- Herring Festival Glyngøre
- Hirtshals Fish Festival
- Kerteminde Cherry Festival
- Norway Lobster Festival, Læsø
- Organic Harvest Market Weekend, nationwide
- ROKOST Food Festival, Roskilde
- Samsø Fjordfestival
- Seafood Festival, Odense
- The Fruit Festival, the South Sea Islands

=== Film ===
- Aarhus Film Festival
- CPH:DOX, documentary films festival in Copenhagen
- CPH:PIX, Copenhagen
- Odense International Film Festival

=== Music ===
- Aarhus Vocal Festival, rhythmic vocal music
- Honky Tonk Music Festival, Nykøbing Sjælland
- Langelandsfestival, Rudkøbing
- Music festival for children, Hørby
- Sommer.Chillout.Aarhus (S.C.A)
- Vendsyssel Festival

Rock and contemporary

- Alive Festival, Thisted
- Blip Festival
- Copenhagen Distortion
- Copenhell, Copenhagen
- Danmarks Grimmeste Festival (Grimfest), Aarhus
- Gilleleje Festival
- Grøn Koncert, across the country
- Helsingør Festival
- Indian Summer Festival, Svendborg
- Klang Copenhagen Avantgarde Music Festival, København
- Nibe Festival
- Nordic Music Days
- NorthSide Festival (Denmark), Aarhus
- Rock Ved Ruinen, Gilleleje
- Roskilde Festival
- Samsø Festival
- Skanderborg Festival (Smukfest)
- Snogebæk
- SPOR Festival, Aarhus
- Spot (music festival), Aarhus
- Start! Festival
- Vig Festival

Alternative

- FROST Festival, Copenhagen
- Nakke Festival, Rørvig

Electronic

Many festivals features electronic music, but a few have specialised in this genre.

- PHONO Festival, Odense
- Strøm Festival, Copenhagen

Jazz

- Aarhus International Jazz Festival
- Ærø Jazz Festival
- Copenhagen Jazz Festival
- Den Blå Festival, Aalborg
- Haderslev Jazz Festival
- Kanal Jazz, Løgstør
- Maribo Jazz Festival
- Nykøbing/Rørvig Jazz Festival, Nykøbing Sjælland
- Ribe Jazz Festival
- Ringkøbing Fjord Jazzfestival
- Riverboat Jazz Festival, Silkeborg
- Roskilde Jazz Days
- Samsø Jazzfestival
- Vinterjazz, across the country

Folk and blues

- Ærø Harmonika Festival
- Copenhagen Blues Festival
- Country Festival, Aalborg
- Country Festival, Gram
- Fanø Free Folk
- Frederikshavns Blues Festival
- Hillerød Folk Festival
- Musik i lejet, Tisvildeleje
- Musikweekend Livø
- SCC Country Festival, Silkeborg
- Skagen Festival
- Tange Sø Folk Festival
- Tønder Festival
- Tunø Festival

Classical and opera

- Aalborg Opera Festival
- Copenhagen Opera Festival
- Copenhagen Summer Festival
- Esbjerg International Chamber Music Festival
- Hindsgavl Festival, at Hindsgavl Castle in Middelfart
- Holstebro International Music Festival
- Kammermusikfestival, Fejø
- Klassiske Dage, Holstebro
- Late Summer Festival, Hvide Sande
- Nørre Vosborg Music Festival
- Rued Langgaard Festival, Ribe
- Samsø Chamber Music Festival
- Sorø International Music Festival
- Thy Chamber Music Festival
- Tivoli Festival
- Vendsyssel Festival
- Vintertoner

== See also ==
- List of annual events in metropolitan Copenhagen
- List of music festivals
- Music of Denmark

== Sources ==
- Danish film festivals VisitDenmark
- Danish food festivals VisitDenmark
- Danish historical festivals VisitDenmark
- Festivalguide Gaffa (in Danish)
- Musikfestivaler i Danmark VisitDenmark (in Danish)
