= Timeline of Copenhagen =

Coordinates: 55.676111°N 12.568333°E

The following is a timeline of the history of the city of Copenhagen, Denmark.

== Prior to 17th century ==
- 1167 – Absalon's Castle founded.
- 1238 – Franciscan monastery founded.
- 1254 – Copenhagen receives city charter.
- 1294 – Wednesdays and Saturdays designated market days.
- 1296 – House of the Holy Ghost founded.
- 1388 – Church of Our Lady rebuilt.
- 1417 – Eric of Pomerania takes Copenhagen Castle.
- 1479
  - City hall built at Gammeltorv.
  - University of Copenhagen founded.
- 1493 - Govaert van Ghemen sets up printing press.
- 1583 – Dyrehavsbakken founded near Copenhagen.

== 17th century ==
- 1604 – Christian IV's Arsenal built.
- 1608 – Caritas Well built.
- 1610
  - City hall rebuilt.
  - Nytorv created.
- 1611 – Leda and the Swan statue erected.
- 1618 – Brewery built.
- 1624 – Rosenborg Castle built.
- 1625 – Copenhagen Stock Exchange founded.
- 1626 – Citadel built.
- 1634 - 5 October: Great wedding (1634) of Magdalene Sibylle of Saxony and Christian, Prince-Elect of Denmark takes place.
- 1640 – Børsen built.
- 1648 – Royal Danish Library founded.
- 1659 – Assault on Copenhagen
- 1661 – Coat of arms of Copenhagen granted.
- 1666 – Holmens Cemetery established.
- 1670 – Kongens Nytorv laid out.
- 1671 – Garnisons Cemetery inaugurated.
- 1673 – Sophie Amalienborg built.
- 1683 – Palace built for Ulrik Frederik Gyldenløve.
- 1686 – Thott Palace built.
- 1695 – Church of Our Saviour built.

== 18th century ==
- 1711 – Plague.
- 1722 - The first public theater, Lille Grønnegade Theatre, is founded.
- 1728
  - Fire.
  - City hall rebuilt between Gammeltorv and Nytorv.
- 1742 - Royal Danish Academy of Sciences and Letters established.
- 1745 – Christiansborg Palace built.
- 1748 – Royal Danish Theatre founded.
- 1751 – Mastekranen built.
- 1752 – Oeder's Garden planted.
- 1757 – Frederiks Hospital opens.
- 1758 – Christian's Church built.
- 1760
  - Amalienborg Palace built.
  - Assistens Cemetery inaugurated.
  - Moses & Søn G. Melchior in business.
- 1769 - Population: 82,086.^{(da)}
- 1770 - City directory published.
- 1771 – Royal Danish Ballet founded.
- 1775
  - Royal Porcelain Factory founded.
  - P.F. Suhm library opens.
- 1777 – Det Dramatiske Selskab is founded.
- 1781 – Vestindisk Pakhus built.
- 1785 – Heering House built.
- 1787 – J. Cl. Todes Døtreskole, the first secondary school for girls, is founded.
- 1791 – Døtreskolen af 1791 is founded.
- 1793 – Royal Danish Library opened to the public.
- 1795 – Fire.

== 19th century ==
- 1801 – Battle of Copenhagen.
- 1807
  - Battle of Copenhagen
  - Royal Commission for the Preservation of Antiquities established.
- 1815 – Copenhagen Court House (with city hall) built at Nytorv.
- 1825
  - Royal Danish Academy of Music founded.
  - Kunstforeningen founded.
- 1828 – Christiansborg Palace rebuilt.
- 1829 – Church of Our Lady rebuilt.
- 1835 - Andersen's Fairy Tales published.
- 1840 - Population: 120,819.^{(da)}
- 1843
  - Tivoli Gardens opens.
  - Tivoli Orchestra formed.
- 1845 – Copenhagen co-host a nordic student meeting with Lund.
- 1846 – Den højere Dannelsesanstalt for Damer is founded.
- 1847
  - Railway station built.
  - Carlsberg brewery founded.
- 1848 – Thorvaldsen Museum built.
- 1850s – Edition Wilhelm Hansen music publisher in business.
- 1856 – Royal School of Library and Information Science founded.
- 1857
  - Folketeatret founded.
  - Charlottenborg Spring Exhibition begins.
- 1859 – Copenhagen Zoo founded.

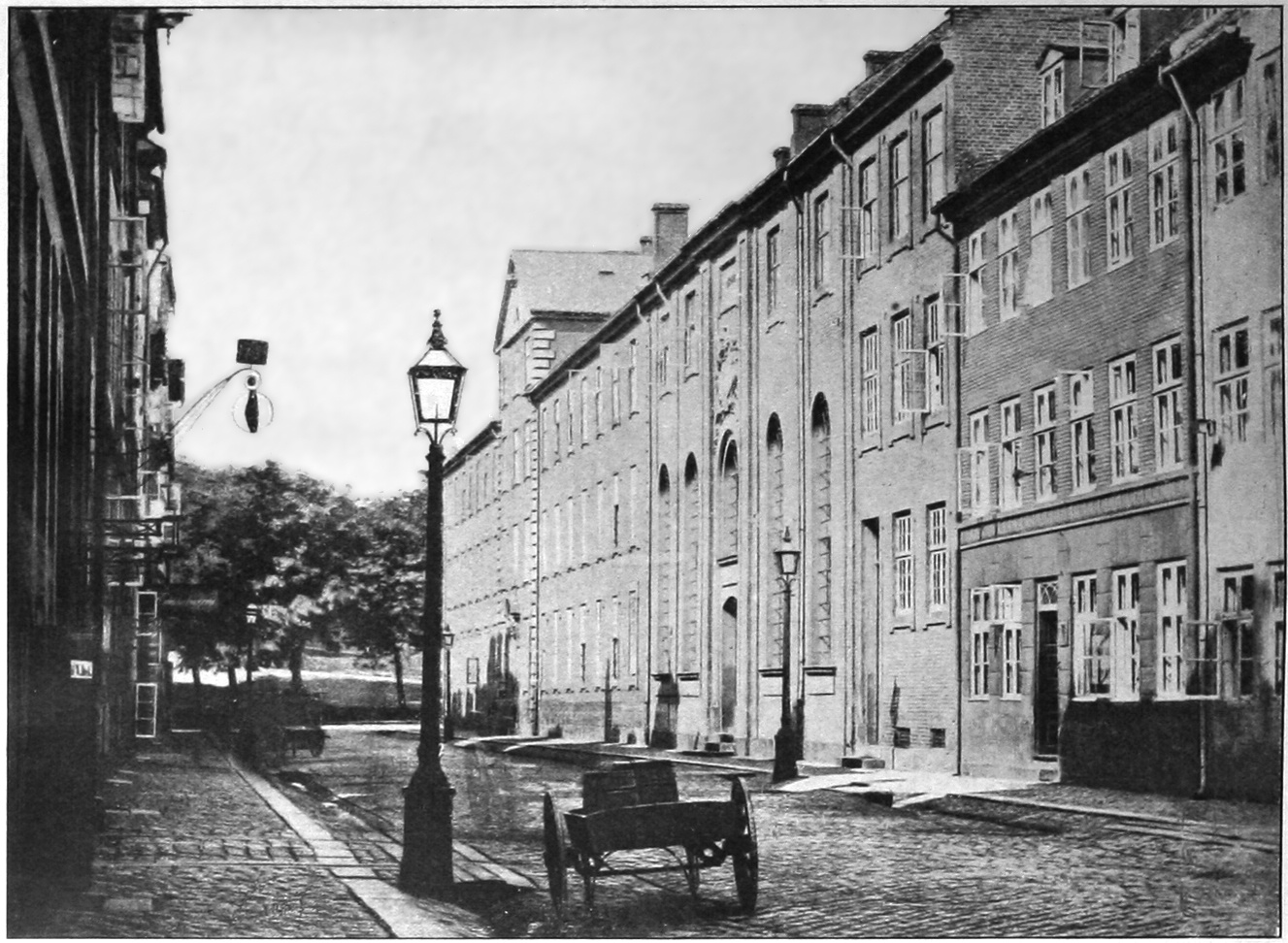
Løngangstræde in Copenhagen in the 1860s

- 1860 – City gates dismantled.
- 1862 – Copenhagen co-host a nordic student meeting with Lund.
- 1865 – Hansen Writing Ball typewriter invented in Copenhagen.
- 1870
  - La Glace (confectionery) in business.
  - Østre Anlæg and Vestre Cemetery established.
  - Population: 202,327.^{(da)}
- 1874 – Botanical Garden glasshouses built.
- 1879
  - Dansk Fotografisk Forening (photo society) headquartered in city.
  - Vesterfælledvej truant school founded.
- 1881 – Children's playground constructed.
- 1882 – Ny Carlsberg Glyptotek established.
- 1883 - Dagmarteatret (theatre) opens.
- 1884 – Dagbladet Politiken newspaper begins publication.
- 1890 - Population: 367,262.^{(da)}
- 1894 – Frederik's Church, popularly known as the "Marble Church", opens.
- 1895 - Copenhagen Women's Exhibition
- 1896 – Statens Museum for Kunst established.
- 1897
  - Østerport Station opens.
  - Coast Line railway begins operating.

== 20th century ==
=== 1900s-1940s ===
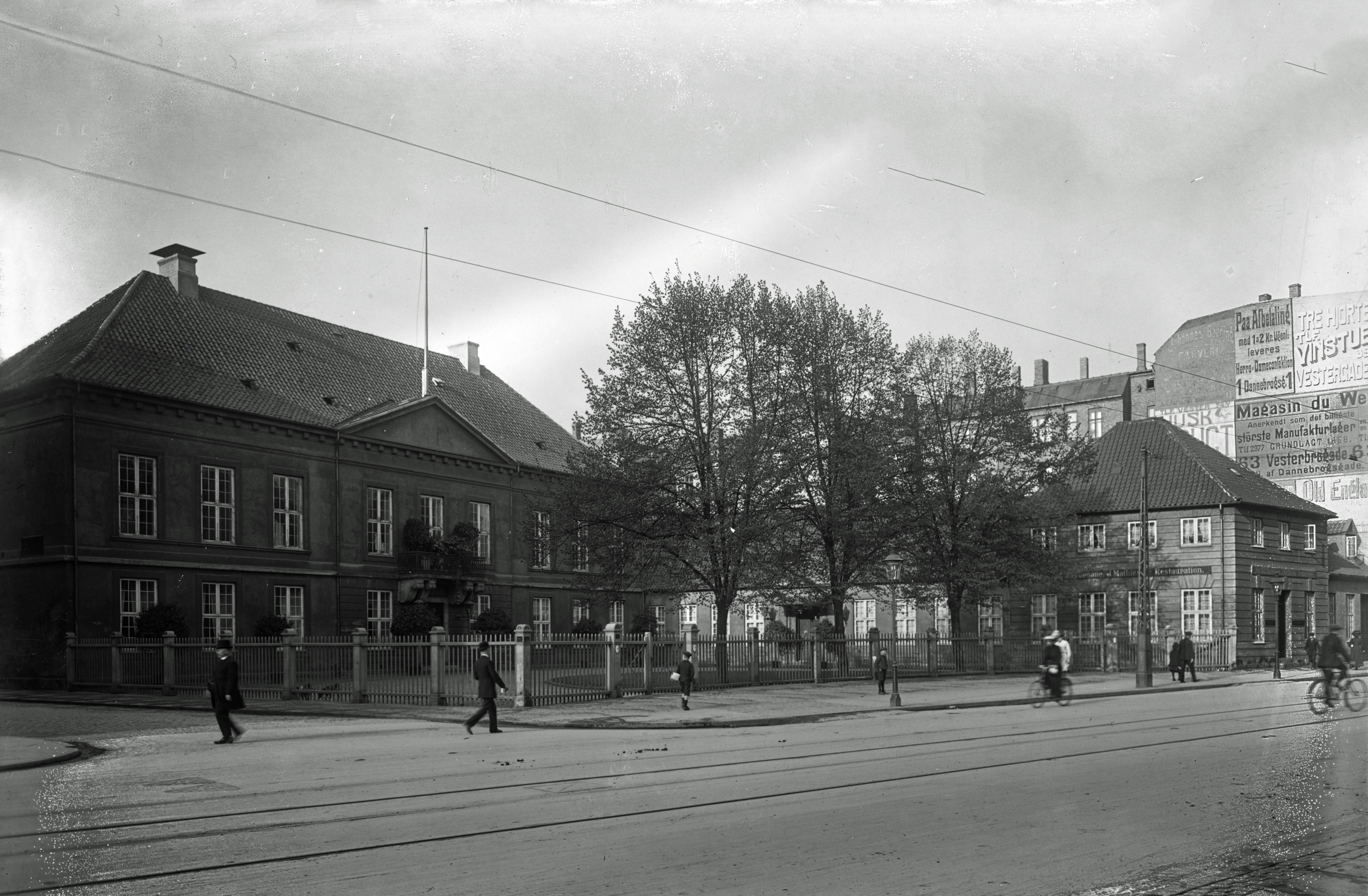
Royal Copenhagen Shooting Society in the 1900s

- 1901
  - City expands.
  - Museum of Copenhagen and International Secretariat of National Trade Union Centres founded.
  - Population: 468,936.^{(da)}
- 1905 – Copenhagen City Hall built on City Hall Square.
- 1907 – Medical Museion established.
- 1910
  - Rigshospitalet built.
  - International socialist women's conference held.
- 1911
  - Copenhagen Central Station, Idrætsparken, and Hirschsprung Collection open.
  - Population: 584,089.^{(da)}
- 1912 – Theatre Museum in the Court Theatre founded.
- 1913
  - Dansk Statens Arkiv for Historiske Film og Stemmer (film archive) founded.
  - The Little Mermaid (statue) unveiled.
- 1915 - January: Conference of Socialist Parties of Neutral Countries held in Copenhagen.
- 1917 - Munksgaards Forlag (publisher) in business.
- 1924 – Alexandra Teatret (cinema) opens.
- 1925
  - Copenhagen Airport, Kastrup and Bakkehuset museum open.
  - Danish National Symphony Orchestra founded.
- 1926 – Forum Copenhagen built.
- 1927 – Grundtvig's Church inaugurated.
- 1928
  - Tøjhus Museum established.
  - Christiansborg Palace rebuilt.
- 1929 – Søndermark Cemetery established.
- 1938 – Palladium (Copenhagen) cinema built.
- 1940 – April: German occupation begins.
- 1943
  - 3 September: Stalag 391 prisoner-of-war camp for Danish POWs established by the Germans.
  - 8 November: Stalag 391 POW camp dissolved.
- 1945
  - 5 May: German occupation ends.
  - Dagbladet Information (newspaper) begins publication.
  - Population: 731,707.
- 1948 – David Collection opens.

=== 1950s-1990s ===
- 1950 – Ryvangen Memorial Park officially inaugurated.
- 1951 - 24 September: World's first successful sex reassignment surgery performed at Gentofte Hospital.
- 1957 – World Santa Claus Congress begins near city.
- 1958 - "Egg" and "swan" chair designs introduced.
- 1962 – Strøget pedestrian zone laid out.
- 1964 – Eurovision Song Contest 1964 held.
- 1971
  - Weekendavisen newspaper begins publication.
  - Freetown Christiania founded.
- 1973 – Roskilde Airport opens.
- 1974 - Greater Copenhagen Council created.
- 1975 - Vester Vov Vov cinema opens.
- 1976
  - Royal Danish Naval Museum established.
  - Population: 1,292,647 urban area.^{(da)}
- 1977
  - 12 December: World's "first AIDS victim" dies in Copenhagen.
  - Frieboeshvile restored.
- 1978 – Danish Design Centre opens.
- 1979 – Copenhagen Jazz Festival begins.
- 1980 – Copenhagen Marathon begins.
- 1983 – Radio Rosa begins broadcasting.
- 1984 – Valby-Hallen opens.
- 1986
  - Fotografisk Center and Rhythmic Music Conservatory established.
  - Worker's Museum opens.
- 1992 – Parken Stadium built.
- 1995
  - Copenhagen City Bikes launched.
  - Danish Architecture Centre founded.
- 1996 – National Museum of Photography and Cisternerne – Museum for moderne Glaskunst founded.
- 1998 – Copenhagen Distortion begins.
- 1999 – Black Diamond (library) built.
- 2000
  - Øresund Bridge opens to Malmö, Sweden.
  - Copenhagen Harbour Buses begin operating.

== 21st century ==
=== 2000s ===
- 2001
  - Copenhagen Free University established.
  - Eurovision Song Contest 2001 held.
- 2002 – Copenhagen Metro and Copenhagen Harbour Baths inaugurated.
- 2003
  - Copenhagen International Documentary Festival and Start! Festival begin.
  - North Atlantic House cultural centre and Noma (restaurant) open.
  - Junior Eurovision Song Contest 2003 held.
- 2004
  - Copenhagen Opera House and Danish Jewish Museum open.
  - Natural History Museum of Denmark formed.
- 2005 – VM Houses built.
- 2006 – DieselHouse opens.
- 2007
  - City becomes part of the Capital Region of Denmark.
  - Karriere Bar and Geranium (restaurant) open.
  - Fictional The Killing (TV series) begins broadcasting.
  - Homeless World Cup football contest held.
- 2008
  - Royal Danish Playhouse opens in Frederiksstaden.
  - 21st European Film Awards held.
  - Mountain Dwellings built.
- 2009
  - United Nations Climate Change Conference held.
  - CPH:PIX film festival begins.

=== 2010s ===
- 2010 – 8 House built.
- 2011
  - Torvehallerne (market) in business.
  - MAD Symposium begins.
- 2012
  - Bicycle superhighway opens.
  - Population: 1,213,882 urban area.^{(da)}
- 2014
  - Cykelslangen (bike bridge) opens in Havneholmen.
  - Eurovision Song Contest 2014 held.
- 2015 – 14–15 February: 2015 Copenhagen shootings occur, killing two civilians and wounding five police officers. The suspected perpetrator was later shot and killed by police.

=== 2020s ===
- 2022
  - 3 July: The Field's mall shooting occurs, killing multiple people.

== See also ==
- History of Copenhagen
- List of lord mayors of Copenhagen
- Copenhagen metropolitan area
- Urban area of Copenhagen
- Timelines of other cities in Denmark: Aarhus
