= History of Copenhagen =

Chronologial history of the Danish capital city

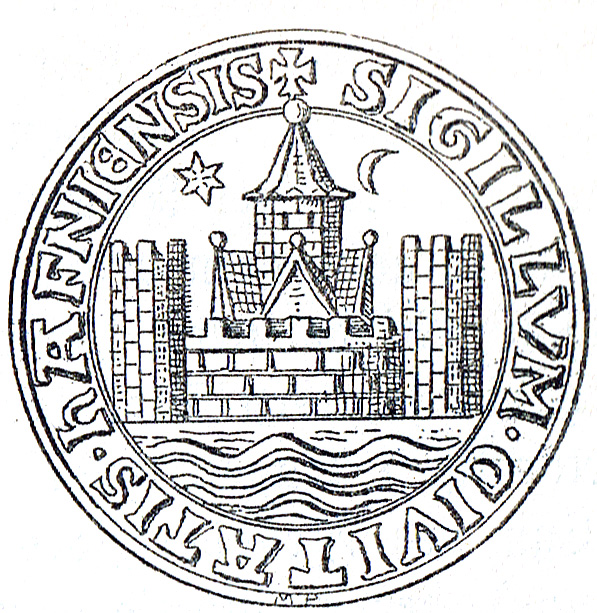
The seal of Copenhagen from 1296

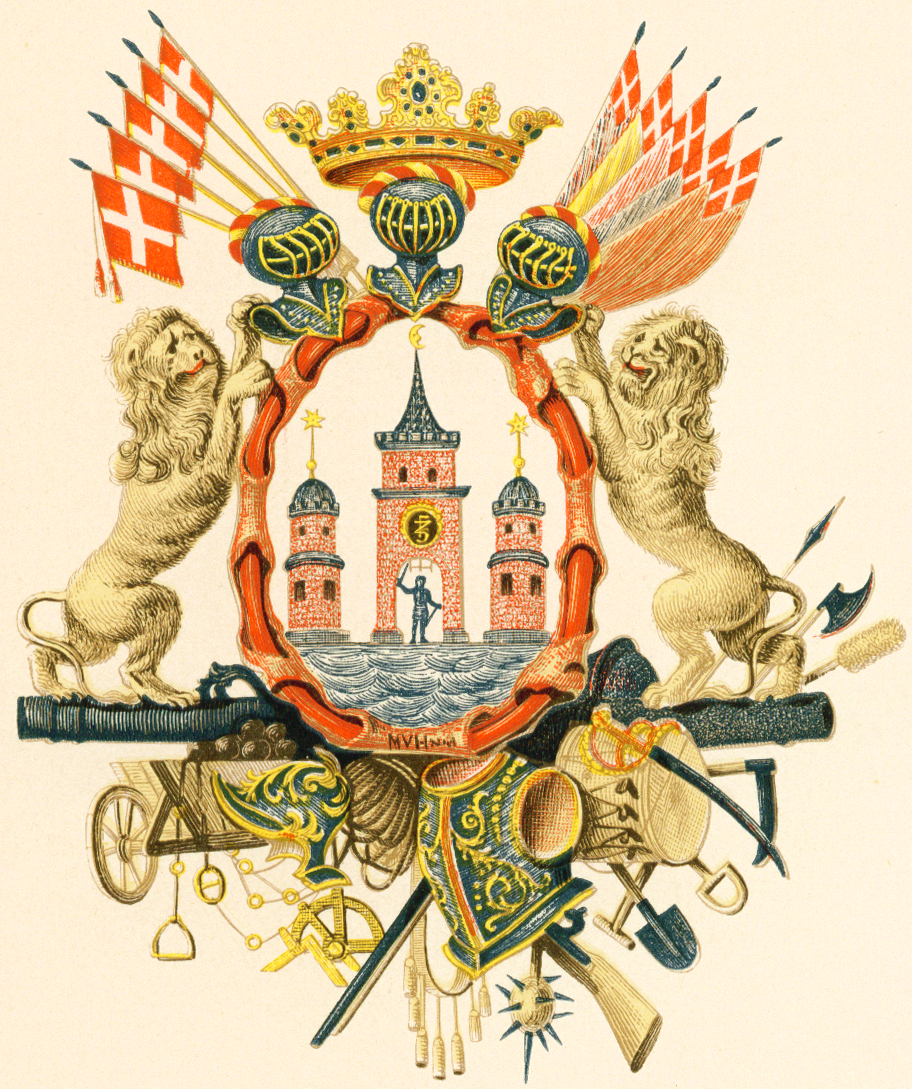
1894 illustration of the Coat of arms of Copenhagen

The history of Copenhagen dates back to the first settlement at the site in the 11th century. From the middle of the 12th century it grew in importance after coming into the possession of Bishop Absalon, and the city was fortified with a stone wall during the 13th century. The harbour and the excellent possibilities for herring fishing contributed to Copenhagen's growth and development into an important trading centre. It was repeatedly attacked by the Hanseatic League as the Germans became aware of its expansion. In 1254, it received its charter as a city under Bishop Jakob Erlandsen.

The town was significantly enlarged under Christian IV of Denmark after his coronation in 1596 by the addition of new city districts and modern fortifications with earthworks and bastions. The king commissioned German and Dutch architects and craftsmen to construct magnificent edifices designed to enhance his prestige. By the time of Christian IV's death in 1648, Copenhagen had become Denmark's principal fortification and naval port, and the town formed a framework for the administration of the Danish kingdom and as a centre of trade in Northern Europe.

During 1658-59 it withstood a severe siege by the Swedes under Charles X and successfully repelled a major assault. In 1728 and again in 1795, the city was ravaged by large fires, which destroyed most of the medieval part of town. In 1801, a British fleet under Admiral Parker fought a major battle, the Battle of Copenhagen, with the Danish navy in Copenhagen harbour. The British fleet defeated the Danes, which subsequently left the Second League of Armed Neutrality. In 1807, another British force bombarded Copenhagen in order to take control of the Danish navy, thus denying it to nascent French plans to invade Britain. The city suffered great damage during the bombardment, and hundreds of its residents were killed or injured. The Danes were unable to put up an effective defence as Copenhagen relied on an old defence line rendered virtually useless by the long ranged bombard ships and mortar batteries employed by the British. But not until the 1850s were the ramparts of the city opened to allow new housing to be built around the lakes which bordered the old defence system to the west. This dramatic increase of space was long overdue, not only because the old ramparts were out of date as a defence system, but also because of bad sanitation in the old city. Before this relaxation, the historic centre of Copenhagen was inhabited by approximately 125,000 people, peaking in the census of 1870 (140,000); today the figure is around 25,000. In 1901, Copenhagen expanded further, incorporating communities with 40,000 people, and in the process making Frederiksberg an enclave within Copenhagen.

Since the summer 2000, the cities of Copenhagen and Malmö have been connected by a toll bridge/tunnel (Øresund Bridge) for both rail and road traffic. As a result, Copenhagen has become the centre of a larger metropolitan area which spans both nations. The construction of the bridge has affected many changes to the public transportation system and the extensive redevelopment of Amager, south of the main city.

== First settlements ==
Signs of human activity dating back to about 4000 BCE have been found, but there are no signs of permanent settlements from that time.

Archaeological excavations indicate that the first town dates back to the 11th century and consisted of two settlements, one in the western part of the medieval city encircled by what are now the streets of Mikkel Bryggersgade, Vestergade, Gammeltorv/Nytorv and Løngangsstræde, roughly corresponding to the coastline of the time, and another smaller settlement at what is now Kongens Nytorv. The surrounding area consisted of moist beach meadows and signs of cattle grazing have been found. The city probably had a harbour located at present day Højbro Plads. Details of the existence of a small town as early as the 11th century have recently been published by Videnskab.dk with a series of articles documenting new archeological finds. These provide evidence of a large estate at today's Kongens Nytorv, a church close to the later St Clemens, a market, at least two wells and many smaller habitations spread over a fairly wide area.

== Absalon's town ==
In the 12th century Copenhagen assumed increasing importance and the town was reinforced with earthworks. The Roman Catholic Church erected cathedrals in Roskilde and in Lund (in what is now Sweden), which laid the basis for further development in those regional centres. As Copenhagen was midway between the two cities, it was centrally located for traffic and trading.

The earliest written mention of the town dates back to the 12th century, when Saxo Grammaticus in Gesta Danorum refers to it as Portus Mercatorum, which translates into Merchants' Harbour or in the Danish of the time Købmannahavn. In a letter from 1186, Pope Urban III refers to the city as Hafn, but this is probably just a shortened version of the full name.

In around 1160, Valdemar I gave control of Copenhagen to Absalon, Bishop of Roskilde. Whereas other cities in the Danish realm were under the governance of the king, Copenhagen was given to the Bishop of Roskilde as its lord and master.

In the years that followed, the town grew tenfold in size. Churches and abbeys were founded. Copenhagen's economy blossomed as a result of the hugely prosperous herring fishery trade, which provided large parts of Roman Catholic Europe with salted herring for Lent.

== Behind the new earthworks ==
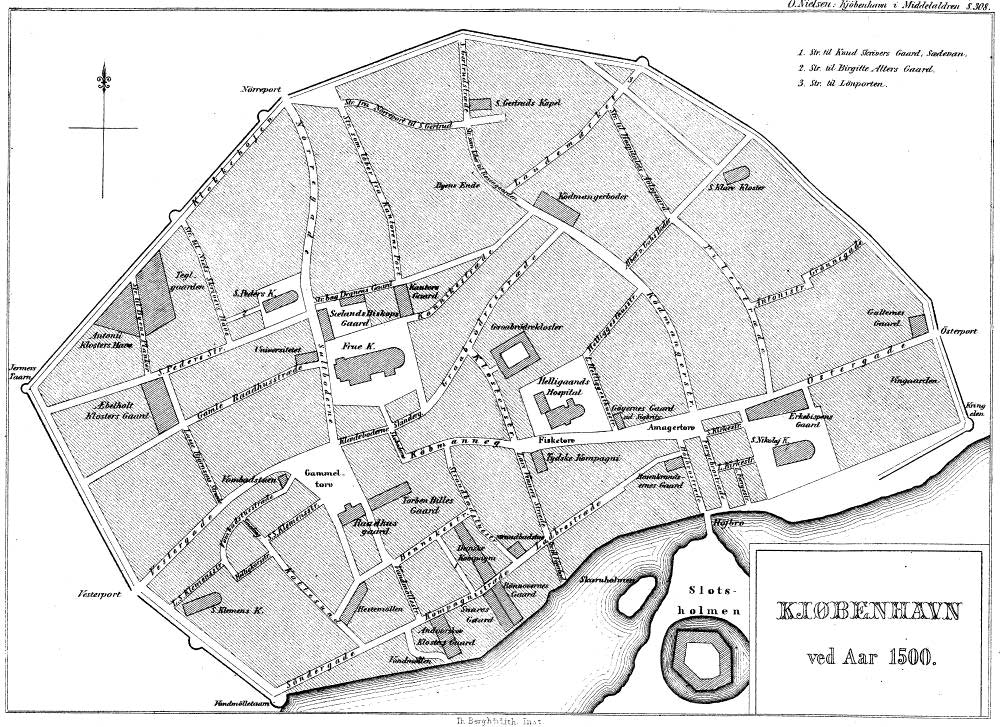
Reconstruction of Copenhagen as of c. 1500

Copenhagen is located at the most important approach to the Baltic Sea and the rich North German trading towns of the Hanseatic League, providing it with power and wealth but also threatening its very existence. The city was fortified with a city wall of stone during the 13th century, and from about 1290 until the middle of the 19th century all traffic entering and leaving Copenhagen had to pass through one of Copenhagen's four city gates or the harbour. Although several Danish towns had ramparts at the time, the majority of them were earth ramparts possibly with palisades on top and a moat. Copenhagen was the second Danish town after Kalundborg to be fortified with a wall and towers. This is a strong indication that it was an important town at the time.

The plague disaster known as the Black Death is likely to have taken place in the late summer of 1350.

Time and again the town was besieged and laid waste by the Hanseatic League. At the same time the Danish king was also attempting to take Copenhagen back from the bishop. The crown succeeded in 1416, when Eric of Pomerania took over control of the town. Thereafter Copenhagen came under the rule of the Danish Crown.

Despite centuries of power struggles and warring, the town grew increasingly rich. Copenhageners did a brisk trade with friend and foe alike. Foreign merchants came to the town. Craft guilds were established and in 1479 the University of Copenhagen was founded.

In 1581 Christopher Valkendorf supervised the largest expansion of the ramparts in the history of the city, as with the invention of cannons vastly extended earth ramparts were required.

== Renaissance ==
By the time of Christian IV's coronation in 1596, Copenhagen had become rich and powerful. The new king decided to make the town the economic, military, religious, and cultural centre for the whole of the Nordic region. The king established the first trading companies with sole rights to trade with lands overseas. In order to restrict imports, factories were set up so that as many goods as possible could be manufactured at home.

Christian IV expanded Copenhagen by adding two new districts: Nyboder (New Booths) for the large numbers of navy personnel and the merchants' new district Christianshavn (Christian's Harbour), which is modelled after Amsterdam. A modern fortification with earthworks and bastions was built to surround the whole of the extended town.

Apart from the new earthworks Christian IV commissioned German and Dutch architects and craftsmen to construct magnificent edifices designed to enhance his prestige. To this day, the buildings make their mark on the cityscape of Copenhagen.

By the time of Christian IV's death in 1648, Copenhagen had become Denmark's principal fortification and naval port, and the town formed a framework for the administration of the Danish kingdom and as a centre of trade in Northern Europe.

During 1658–59 the city withstood a severe siege by the Swedes under Charles X Gustav.

== 18th century ==
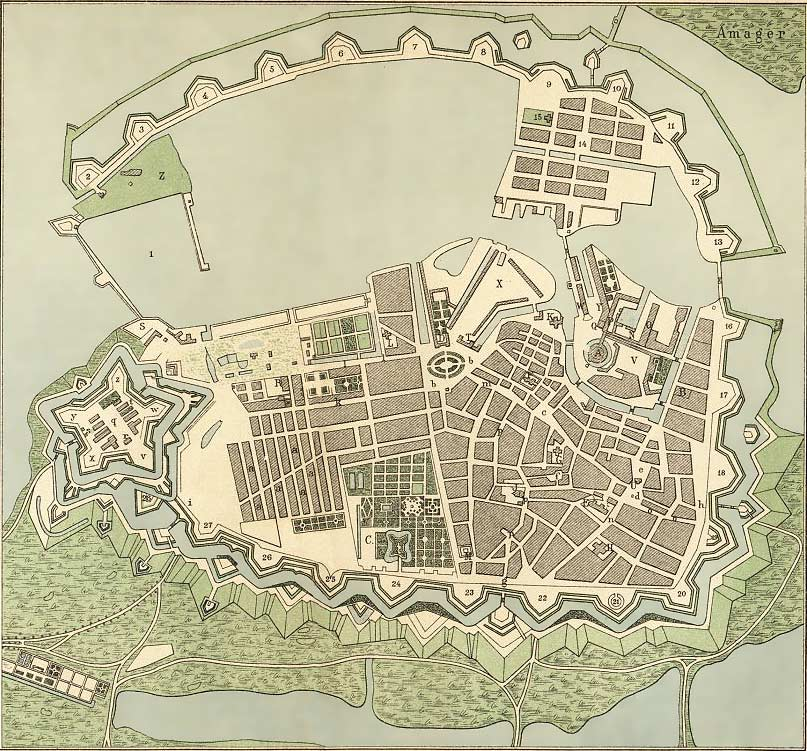
Copenhagen, 1728. Up is approximately southeast.

In July 1700, Copenhagen underwent a bombardment from a combined fleet of Dutch, English and Swedish warships but did not suffer much damage. From June 1711 to March 1712, it was haunted by the plague which killed about a third of the population.

During the fire of 1728 about a third of the city (the entire northern part), 1,600 houses and five churches burned down in the course of four days. Christian VI tore the old Copenhagen Castle down in 1731–32 to replace it with Christiansborg Palace, and during the reign of Frederick V Frederiksstaden, the most distinguished district of Copenhagen, with Amalienborg Palace at its center, was developed.

Near the end of the 18th century, Copenhagen's trade and the wealth that followed reached its so far highest level. Although the fire of 1795 destroyed about a quarter of the city and rendered 3,500 homeless, the damage was relatively quickly repaired and most of the city was rebuilt by the turn of the 19th century.

== 19th century ==
On 2 April 1801 a British fleet under the command of Admiral Sir Hyde Parker fought and defeated a Danish-Norwegian fleet anchored just off Copenhagen. Vice-Admiral Horatio Nelson led the main attack. He famously disobeyed Parker's order to withdraw, silence most of the Dano-Norwegian ships before the defeated Danes signed a truce with the British. Copenhagen is often considered to be Nelson's hardest fought battle, surpassing even the heavy fighting at Trafalgar. It was during this battle that Lord Nelson famously "put the telescope to the blind eye" in order not to see Admiral Parker's signal to cease fire.

The Second Battle of Copenhagen (or the Bombardment of Copenhagen) (16 August – 5 September 1807) was a British preemptive attack on Copenhagen carried out to seize the Dano-Norwegian fleet and prevent it from being used by France. After the Danish refused to surrender their fleet, the British landed 30,000 troops and surrounded Copenhagen. They carried out a bombardment for the next three days, during which several hundred people were killed or injured and roughly 1,000 buildings were burnt. The Danish were unable to put up an effective defence because Copenhagen relied on an old defence-line rendered virtually useless by the increase in shooting range available to the British. Virtually the entire Danish fleet was captured, and Denmark joined the Napoleonic Wars on the side of France, though without a navy it could do little.

The political after-effects of the conflict did even greater damage to the city and the nation. If the previous 25 years had been a heyday for Copenhagen, the next 25 years became a period of poverty. Surprisingly science, literature and art blossomed. Following the July Revolution of 1830 the Danish liberal and national movement gained momentum, and after the European Revolutions of 1848 Denmark became a constitutional monarchy on June 5, 1849. On January 1, 1840, the city was given a new municipal constitution which was expanded on March 4, 1857.

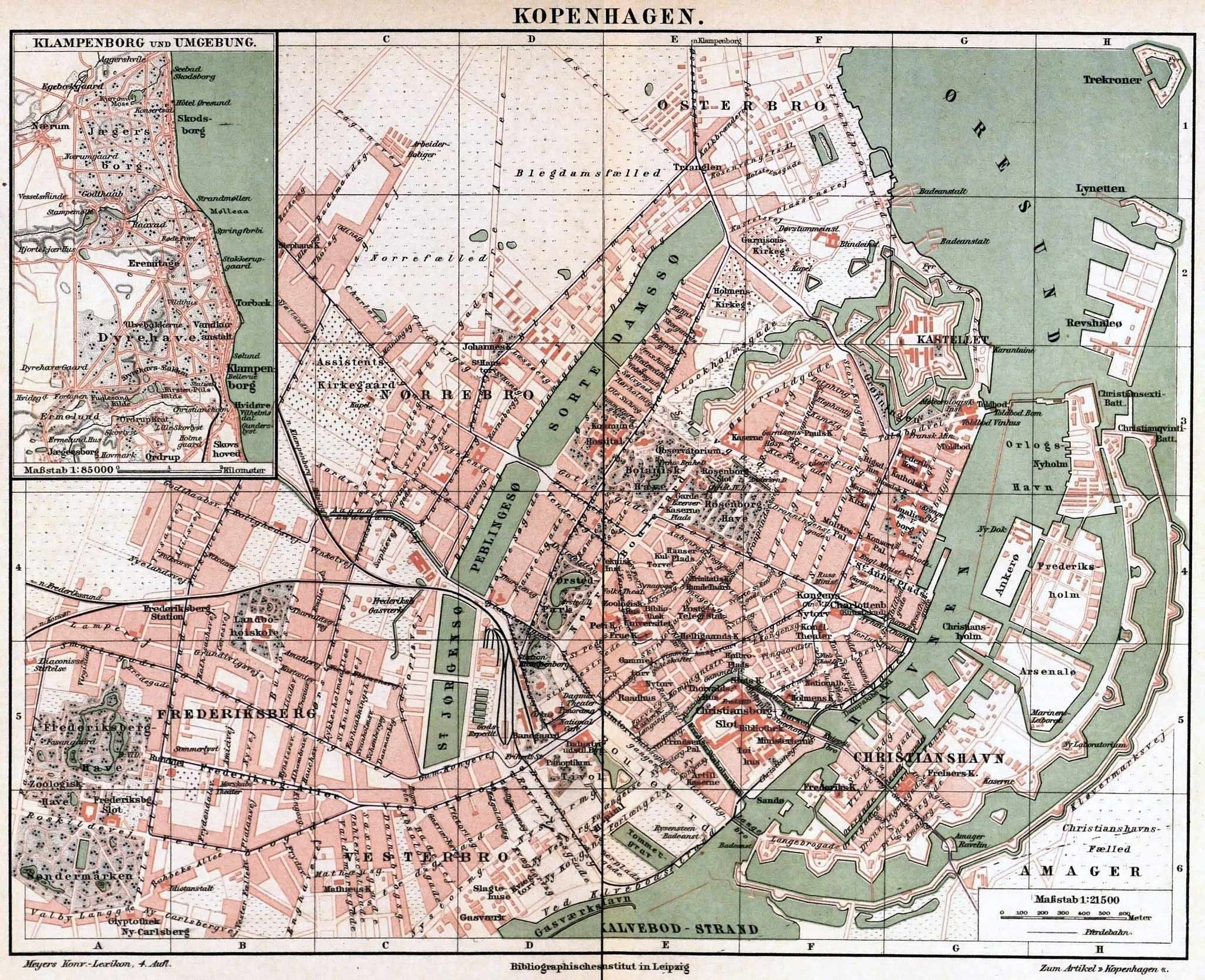
Copenhagen c. 1888

Roughly at the same time the ramparts of the city opened to allow new housing to be built around the lakes ("Søerne") which bordered the old defence system to the west. This dramatic increase in space was long overdue, not only because the old ramparts were out of date as a defence system, but also because of bad sanitation in the old city. As the area within the ramparts had been almost constant since the reign of Christian IV despite a fourfold increase in the population, the buildings had become taller and the amount of space available to residents had decreased. By relaxing the demarcation line introduced as a result of the defences, unrestricted permission to build property outside the lakes was introduced in 1852. This caused a considerable growth in Nørrebro, Vesterbro and Frederiksberg. A new neighbourhood arose in 1861–77 on the island of Gammelholm as Holmen Naval Base was moved to Nyholm, and large parts of Nyboder were changed into ordinary residences. In 1868 it was decided to remove the ramparts and from 1872 the old glacises were converted into residential areas. By the construction of Frihavn harbour in 1894 another neighbourhood was founded stretching towards Hellerup. In 1900–01, the large developments of Brønshøj and Valby followed.

The Second War of Schleswig in 1864 (where Denmark lost a third of its area) was the primary reason the old ramparts were replaced by the Fortification of Copenhagen.

== 20th century ==
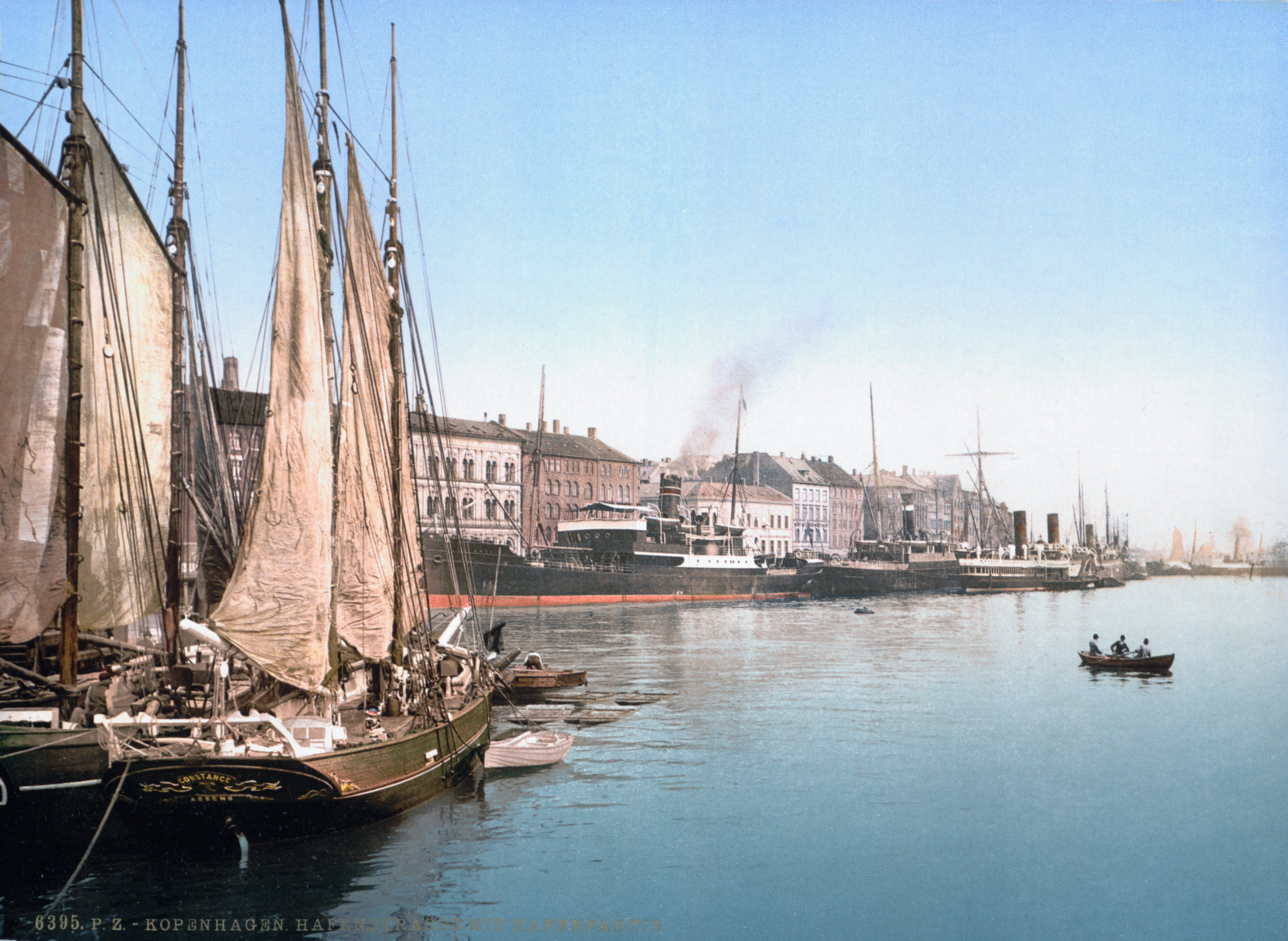
Havnegade, Copenhagen, c. 1900

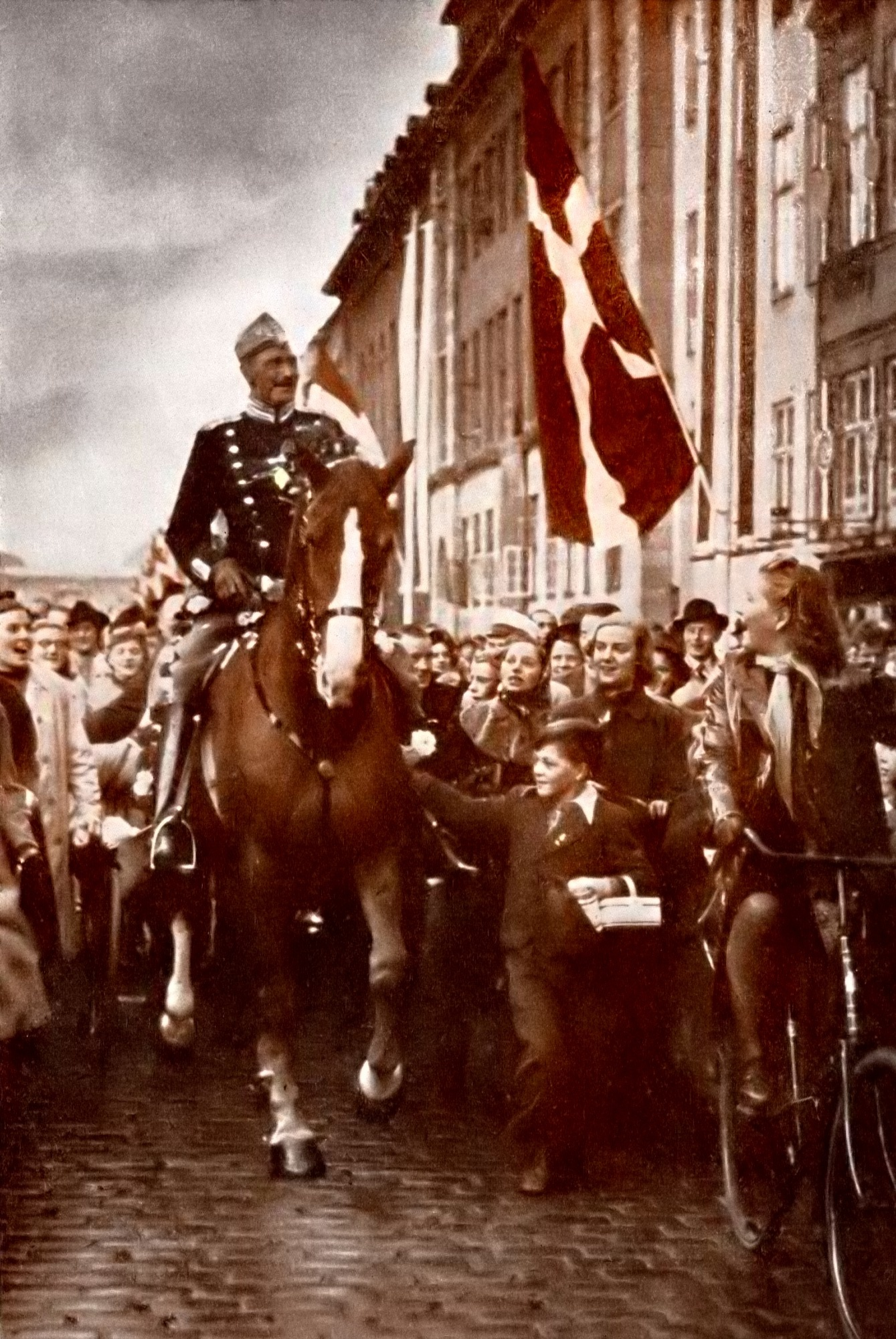
Christian X riding through Copenhagen on his birthday on 26 September 1940, during World War II.

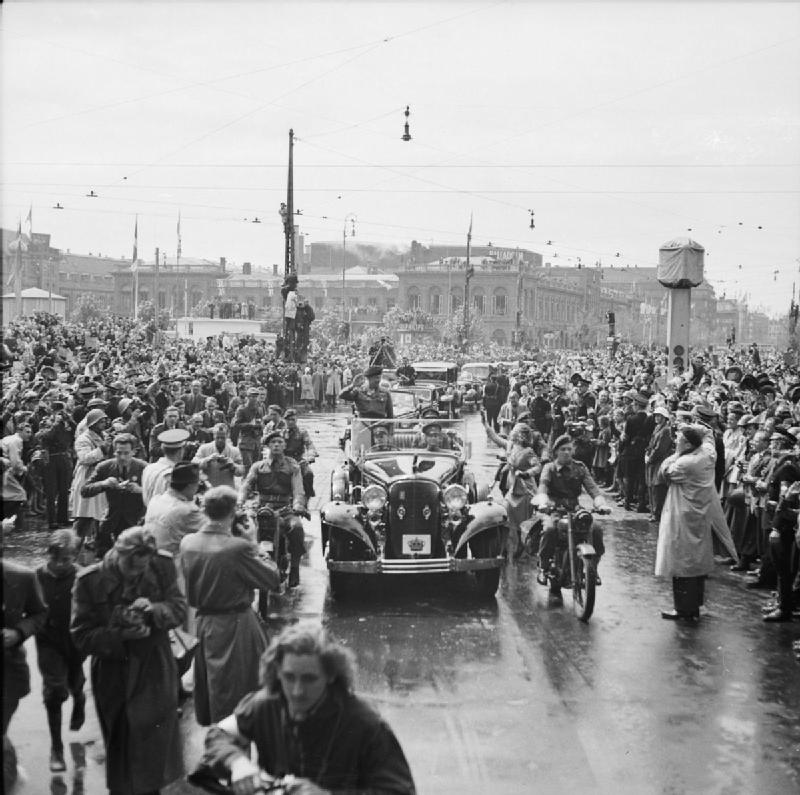
Field Marshal Montgomery salutes hundreds of Danes lining the streets shortly after liberation in May 1945

During World War II Copenhagen was occupied by German troops along with the rest of the country from April 9, 1940, until May 4, 1945. In August 1943, when the government's collaboration with the occupation forces collapsed, several ships were sunk in Copenhagen Harbour by the Royal Danish Navy to prevent them being used by the Germans. Operation Carthage (the bombardment of the Shellhouse, the headquarters of the Gestapo) took place on March 21, 1945, by British de Havilland Mosquito bombers. During this attack the French School at Frederiksberg was also mistakenly bombed resulting in the death of many children. On 8 May 1945 Copenhagen was officially liberated by British troops led by Field Marshal Bernard Montgomery who supervised the surrender of 250,000 German armed forces across Denmark of which near on 30,000 were situated around the capital.

The city has grown greatly since the war. In the 1970s, the so-called five-finger-plan provided commuter train links to the surrounding towns and suburbs. Conditions in the central city deteriorated rapidly in the 1980s and 1990s. Financially the city verged on bankruptcy. Negative factors included de-industrialization, flight to the suburbs, high unemployment, escalating welfare, dilapidated housing, and ethnic strong segregation. The city recovered rapidly by 2010, thanks to its service- and knowledge-based economy.

In 1992 construction on the Copenhagen Metro and in 1993 development of a new city area, the Ørestad, began on the island of Amager. The metro underground train system opened for traffic in 2002.

Since the summer of 2000, the cities of Copenhagen and Malmö have been connected by a toll bridge, the Øresund Bridge, for both rail and road traffic. It was inaugurated in July 2000 by Carl XVI Gustaf of Sweden and Margrethe II of Denmark. As a result, Copenhagen has become the centre of a larger metropolitan area spanning both nations. The construction of the bridge has brought about significant changes in the public transportation system and the extensive redevelopment of Amager, south of the main city. The bridge has not yet been as widely used by motorists as was originally hoped, likely due to the high road tolls, allegedly slowing the planned integration of the region. Train passengers, however, are plentiful and increasing in numbers. The lack of a commonly acceptable currency throughout the area is another hindrance to the integration of the region, even though a growing number of shops, restaurants etc., if not usually encouraged, accept payment with either nation's currency in the other country.

In December 2009 Copenhagen hosted the worldwide climate meeting COP15. When US President Barack Obama participated in the end of this meeting it was the fourth time an American President had visited Copenhagen during his term (Obama also visited Copenhagen in October 2009, George W. Bush in 2005 and Bill Clinton in the 1990s).

== See also ==
- Timeline of Copenhagen
