= List of annual events in metropolitan Copenhagen =

This list of annual events in metropolitan Copenhagen is a list of festivals and other annual events in metropolitan Copenhagen, Denmark.

== Music ==
Month	Event	Location	Year first run
February	Copenhagen Cooling – winter	Citywide	
February	Copenhagen Fashion Week	Citywide	1968
April	CPH:PIX	Citywide	2005
May	Copenhagen Beer Celebration	Sparta Hallen	2010
May	Copenhagen Beer Festival	Tap 1 (Carlsberg)	2001
May	Copenhagen Carnival	Ørestad	1982
May	Copenhagen Marathon	Citywide	1982
June	Copenhagen Distortion	Citywide	1998
June	Copenhell	Refshaleøen	2005
June	Kulturhavn	Port of Copenhagen	
June/July	Roskilde Festival	Roskilde	1971
July	Copenhagen Jazz Festival	Citywide	2001
August	Copenhagen Historic Grand Prix	Bellahøj	1979
August	Copenhagen Summer Dance	Copenhagen Police Headquarters	
August	Pride Copenhagen	City centre	
August	Trailerpark Festival	Copenhagen Skatepark	2007
August	Vanguard Festival	Søndermarken	
August	Strøm Festival	Enghaveparken /main venue)	
August	Scandinavia Ragae Festival	Refshaleøen	2012
August	Copenhagen Cooking	Citywide	2005
August	Copenhagen Fashion Week	Citywide	
August	Asteroiden	Refsgaleøen	2012
August	Round Christiansborg Open Water Swim	Slotsholmen	
August	Ironman Copenhagen	Greater Copenhagen	2010
August	Copenhagen Art Week	City-wideref	
August/September	Art Copenhagen	Forum Copenhagen	1997
September	Golden Days	Citywide	1994
October	Eremitage Race	Jægersborg Dyrehave	1969
October	Culture Night	Citywide	2003
October	Wundergrund Festival	misc.	
November	CPH:DOX	Citywide	2003
November	Copenhagen Book Fair	Bella Center	1992
November	St Hubertus Hunt	Jægersborg Dyrehave	

== Gallery ==
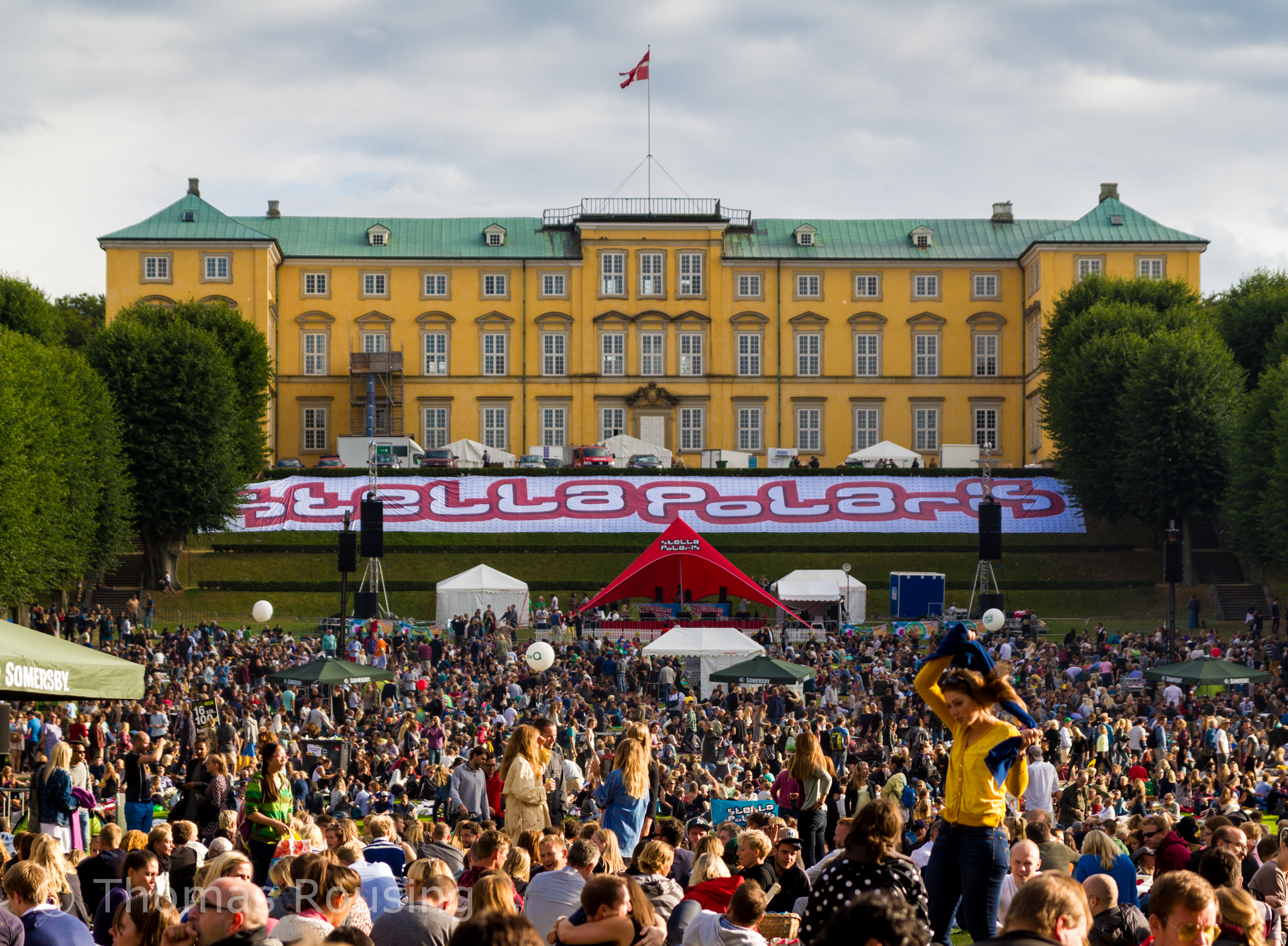
Stella Polaris in Frederiksberg Gardens
