= Brønshøj Water Tower =

Water tower in Copenhagen, Denmark

Coordinates: 55°42′01″N 12°29′54″E

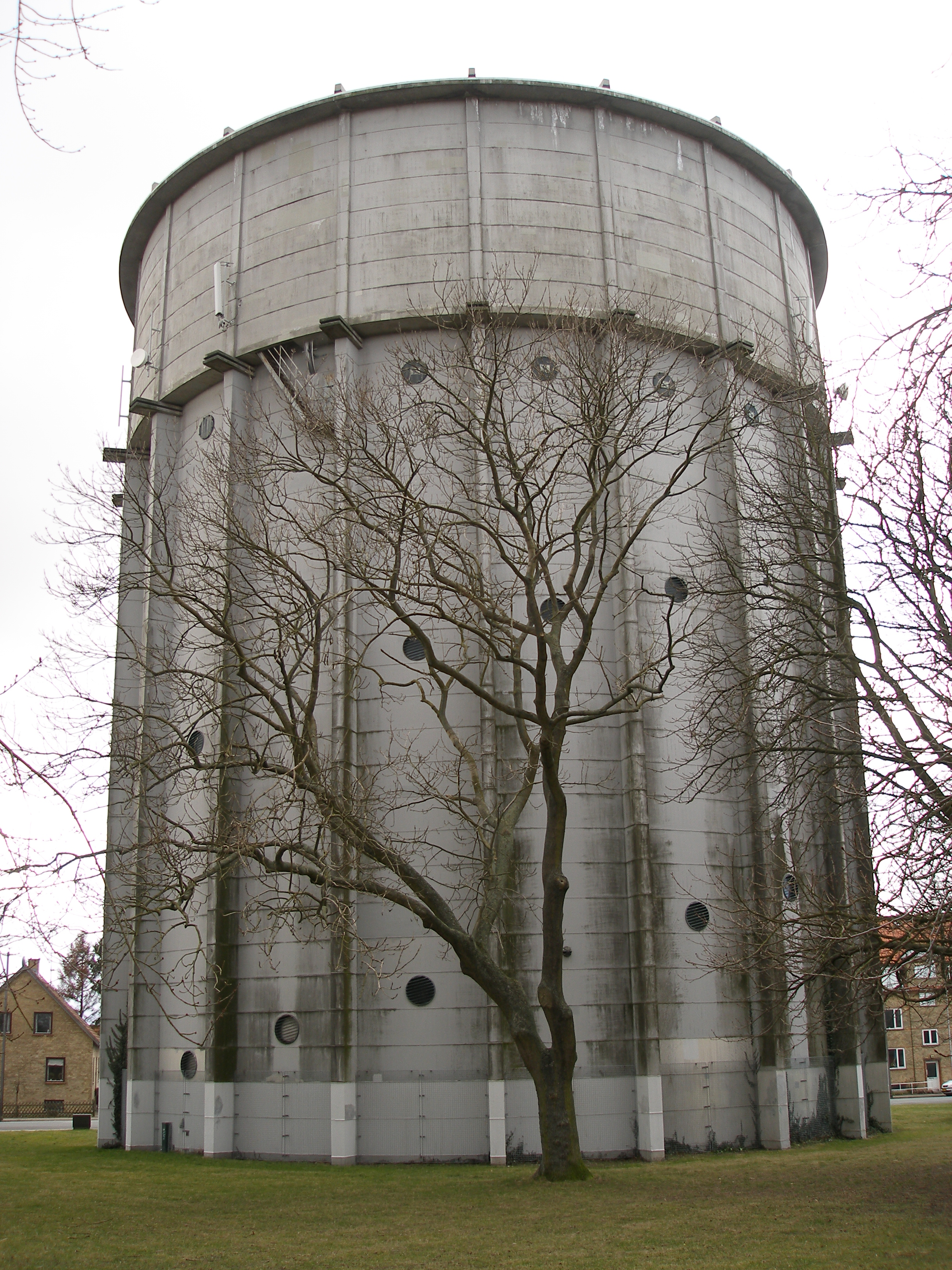
Brønshøj Water Tower

Brønshøj Water Tower (Danish: Brønshøj Vandtårn) is a water tower in the Brønshøj district of Copenhagen, Denmark. It is owned by Hofor and was listed in 2000.

== History ==
The water tower was designed by Ib Lunding who worked as project architect under City Architect Poul Holsøe. It was listed in 2000 and went through a major renovation in 2005.

== Architecture ==
The water tower is built in reinforced concrete. It has a round foot print and pilasters at close intervals. The lower part of the structure has round windows in a helix arrangement. It has a diameter of 20 m and is 34 m tall.
