= Carlstad =

Fortified town in Denmark

Coordinates: 55°42′13″N 12°30′15″E

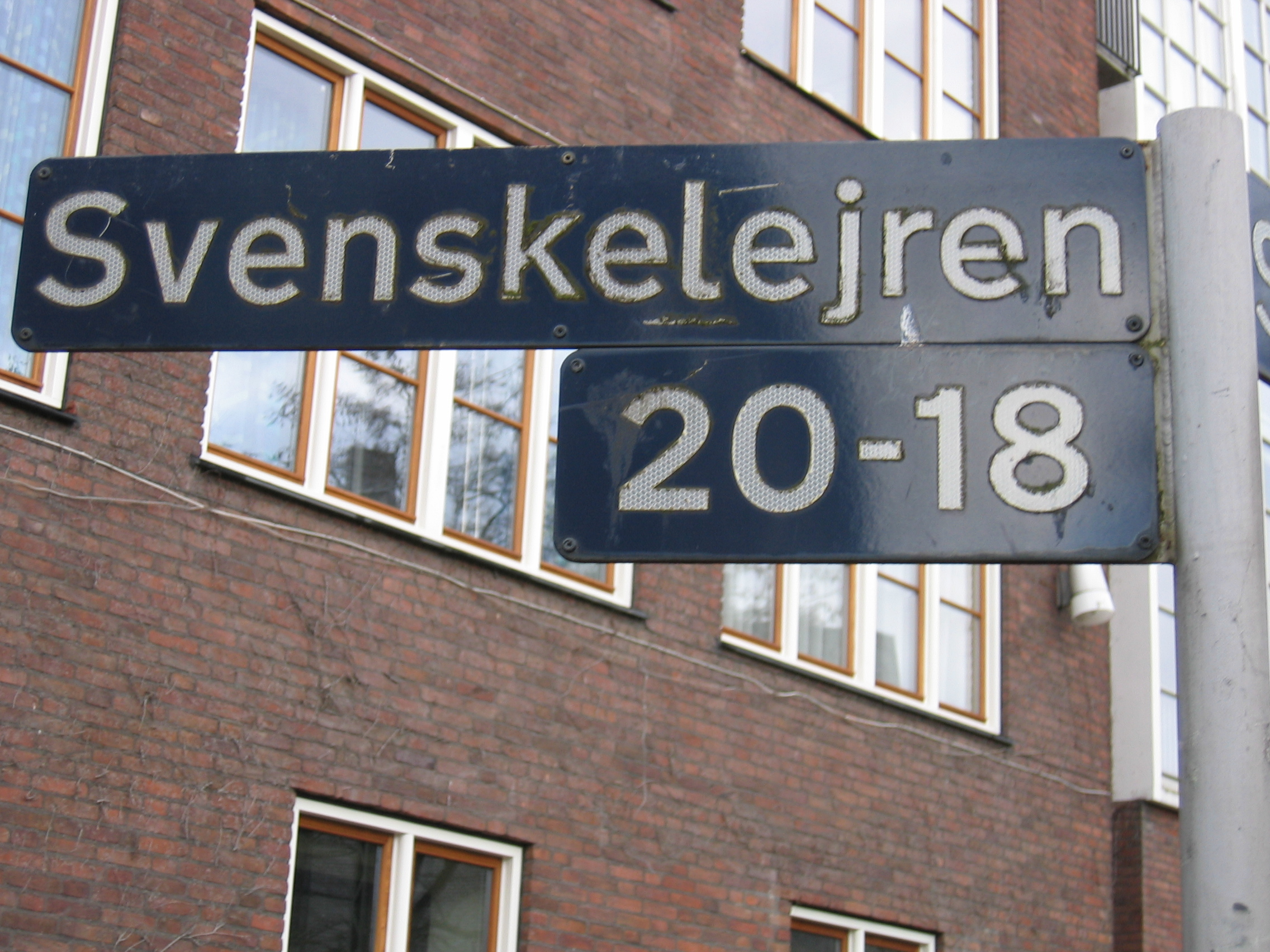
Svenskelejren, a modern Bellahøj road named after the Swedish encampment

Carlstad was a short lived fortified town in Denmark built by the forces of King Charles X Gustav of Sweden during his assault on Copenhagen (1659).

At its peak, Carlstad's size rivalled the besieged Danish capital, reaching a peak of approx. 30,000 inhabitants. Carlstad's population, primarily consisting of army personnel and followers, rivalled that of Copenhagen itself.

== History ==
After a successful campaign of Jutland, Funen, and Zealand, Charles X Gustav began a siege of Copenhagen intending to remove his country's traditional enemy once and for all. He decided to encamp his army to the west of the city with its centre on the village Brønshøj, now a northwestern Copenhagen district. The site occupied an elevated position 4 km from the Danish capital. The topographical features of the site were applied for strategic use. With its location significantly higher than Copenhagen, Bellahøj ridge provided a natural eastern rampart, also providing a view over the besieged city. Carlstad's northern site was flanked by a great marsh. The land descended to the west and south of the camp.

== Legacy ==
No evidence of the fortress earthwork have been preserved. Brønshøj Museum contains information from the Swedish wars 1658-1660 including a number of artifacts and models of the fortress. The modern Copenhagen districts of Brønshøj, Bellahøj and Utterslev are located on or near the site. Several nearby streets are named for it; e.g. Svenskelejren (Swedish Camp) and Skansebjerg (Trench Hill). The only preserved building extant at the time of the encampment is Brønshøj Church (Brønshøj Kirke). During the Swedish occupation, the church's interior was destroyed and the building used as an armoury and weapons store.

== Other sources ==
- Sebastian Olden-Jørgensen (2011)Stormen på København 1659 – Et københavnsk og nationalt erindringssted gennem 350 år (Museum Tusculanums Forlag) ISBN 978-87-635-3609-7
