= Brønshøj Church =

Coordinates: 55.7058°N 12.4985°E

- Brønshøj Parish Church
- Brønshøj Kirke
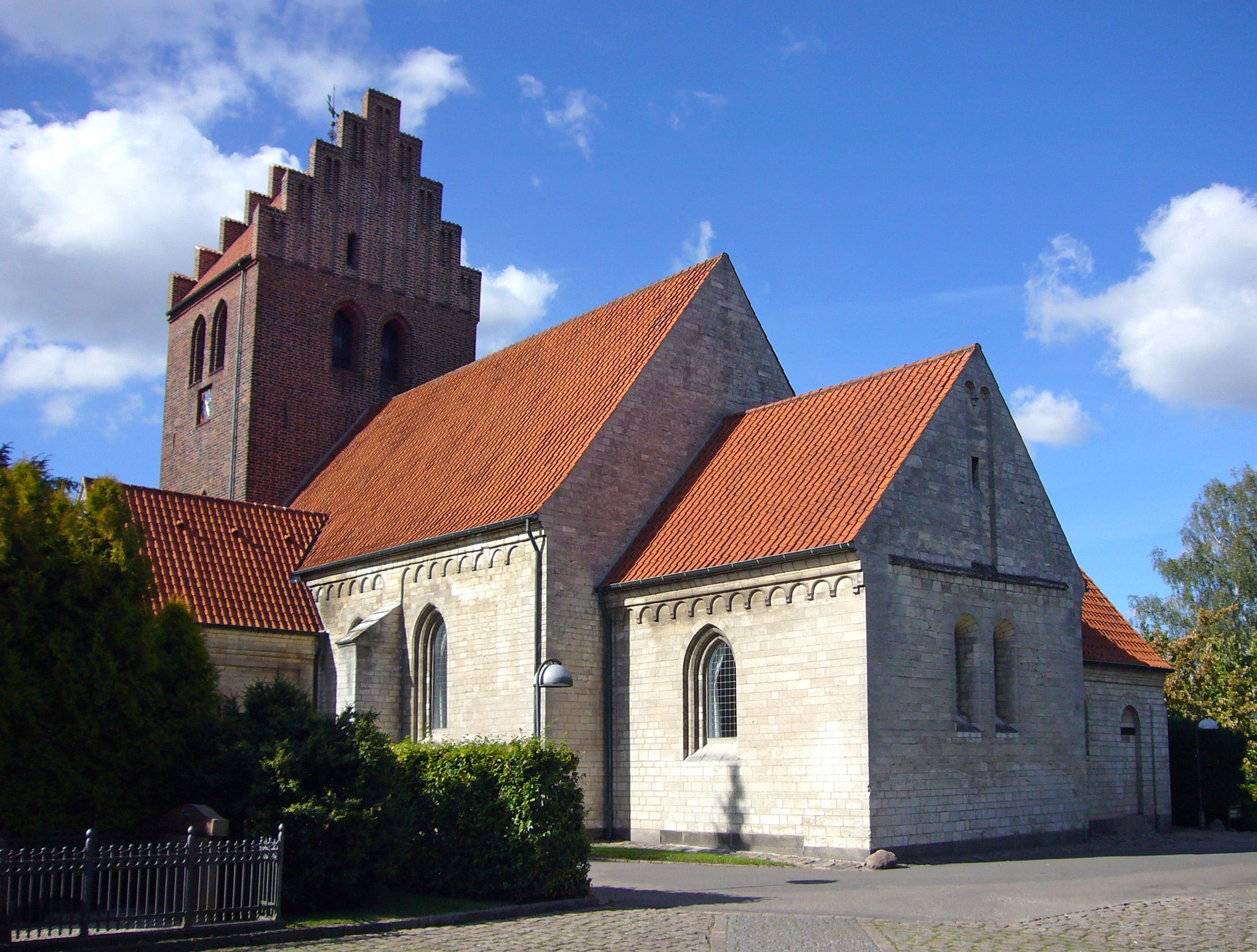
- Brønshøj Church
- Location: Copenhagen
- Country: Denmark
- Denomination: Church of Denmark
- Website: Church website

History
- Status: Active
- Founded: 1180s
- Founder: Absalon
- Dedication: Saint Lawrence

Architecture
- Functional status: Parish Church
- Architectural type: Romanesque

Administration
- Diocese: Copenhagen
- Deanery: Bispebjerg-Brønshøj
- Parish: Brønshøj

Clergy
- Bishop: Peter Skov-Jakobsen
- Dean: Johanne Haastrup
- Pastor: Peter Nejsum,

Brønshøj Church is a Church of Denmark parish church in Brønshøj, Copenhagen, Denmark.

== History ==
The church was built in the 1180s in the Romanesque style by bishop Absalon using chalk ashlar. Its original dedication was to saint Laurence and it first appears in the written record under that name in two papal letters of 21 October 1186 and 25 March 1193, stating that Absalon owned a 'bol' in Brønshøj and was the church's patron. A redbrick Gothic tower was added around 1450, a porch in 1892 and a sacristy in 1942.

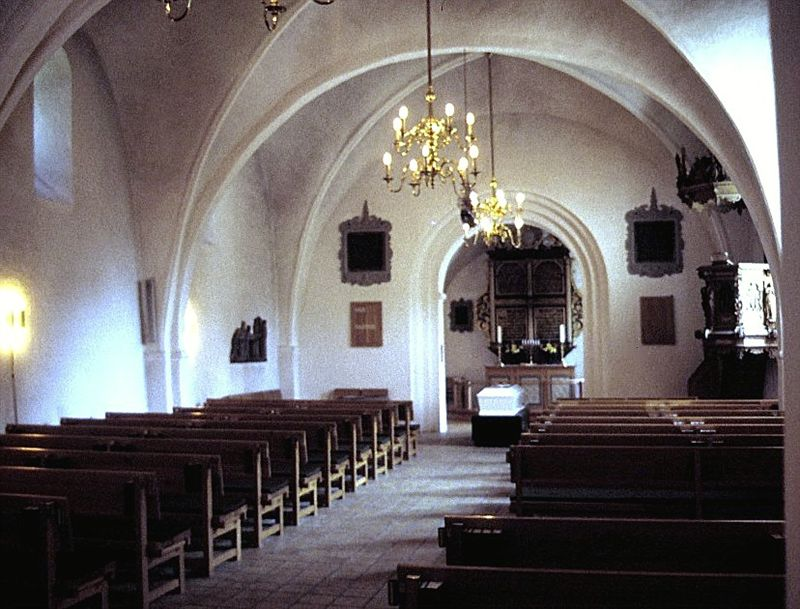
Interior of the Church.

During the Swedish occupation of 1658, the church's interior was destroyed and the building used as an armoury and weapons store. Its 1587 altarpiece and its font were both preserved, though the rest of the church furniture was lost - the current Baroque pulpit dates from 1678. The British also camped in the church's cemetery in 1807 during the battle of Copenhagen. After its parish became part of the Copenhagen Municipality in 1901, it became the oldest building in the municipality. The church passed to private ownership on 1 October 1934.

== Cultural references ==
The church and cemetery has been used as a location in the films Min søsters børn på bryllupsrejse (1967), Zappa (1983) Max pinlig (2008).

== Sources ==
- "Brønshøj Kirke - Danmarks kirker". danmarkskirker.natmus.dk.
