= Brønshøj Rytterskole =

Building in Copenhagen, Denmark

Coordinates: 55.7039°N 12.4980°E

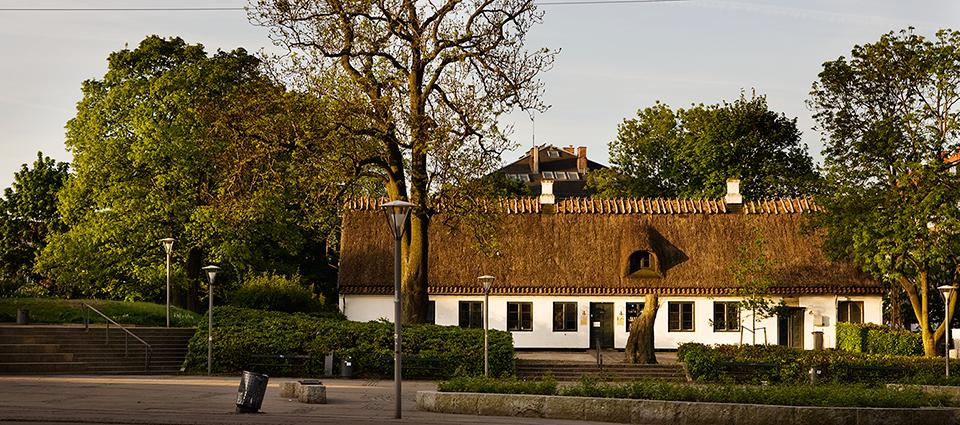
Brønshøj Rytterskole

Brønshøj Rytterskole is a listed building on Brønshøj Torv in the Brønshøj-Husum district of Copenhagen, Denmark. It is owned by Copenhagen Municipality and used as a venue for local cultural events and meetings.

== History ==
The building is a former rytterskole built by Frederick IV in 1723. A total of 19 such schools were built in Københavns rytterdistrikt, located in Hvidovre, Valby, Brønshøj, Gladsaxe, Gentofte, Hvidøre, Lyngby, Farum, Lille Værløse, Slaglunde, Ganløse, Målev, Ballerup, Ledøje, Herstedøster, Herstedvester, Hvissinge, Brøndbyøster and Brøndbyvester.

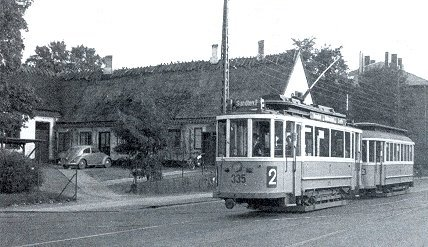
A tram passing Brønshøj Rytterskole in 1961

Brønshøj Rytterskole was expanded with a half-timbered out-building located to the southwest of the main building in the 1780s. The school building originally had a tile roof but it was replaced by a thatched roof some time before 1834. The building went through several more changes during the 19th century, including the construction of a new wing perpendicular to the main wing in 1894.

A new school was built in 1899 but the old one remained in use until 1832. From 1904 it also served as the local library. The library was moved in 1939 and for a while the building was used as a residence.

Brønshøj Museum opened in the building in 1988. It was later merged with the Museum of Copenhagen.

== Exhibitions ==
The building houses 6–8 temporary exhibitions a year covering a wide range of subjects.

On the first floor is a permanent exhibition about Carlstad.
