= Bellahøj =

Area northwest of central Copenhagen, Denmark

Coordinates: 55°42′20″N 12°30′45″E

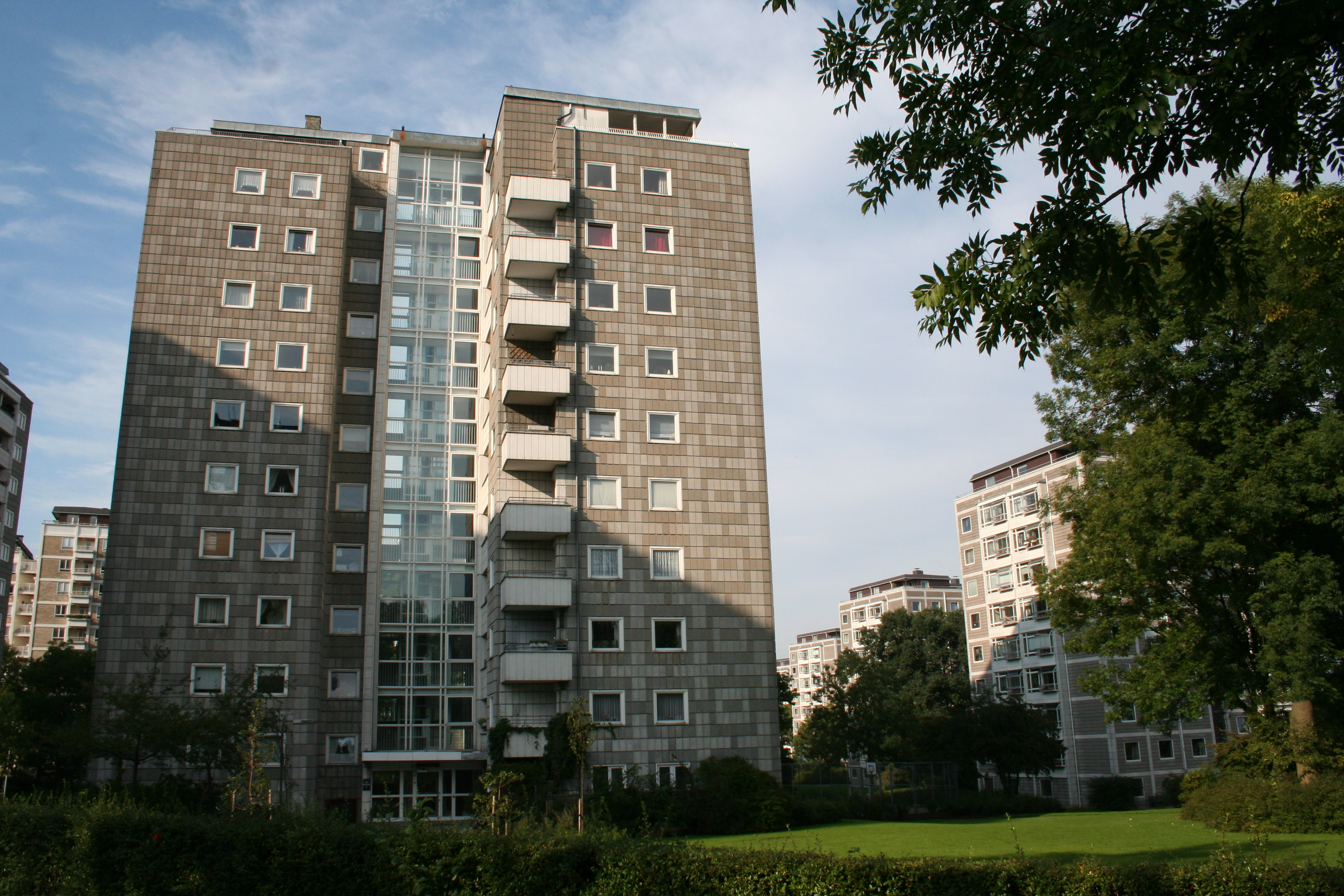

Bellahøj is an area situated 5 kilometres to the northwest of central Copenhagen, Denmark. It features the Bellahøj Houses, a functionalist housing project, as well as parkland with an open-air theatre. The 37 metre high hill situated in Bellahøj Park is the highest point in Copenhagen. The area offers an extensive view over the skyline of Copenhagen.

== History and description ==
King Charles X Gustav of Sweden's fortified camp Carlstad was located at the site during his siege of Copenhagen from 1658 to 1660. The area later belonged to a farm which moved out from the village of Utterslev in 1791. The estate was acquired by Copenhagen Municipality in 1932. The area was used for agricultural shows between 1938 and 1967. The old farmhouse was converted into a restaurant in 1938 and is still used as such. Copenhagen Municipality sold the building in 2005

The Bellahøj Houses contains 28 tower blocks. Each block has between 9 and 13 floors. The housing project was among the earliest in Scandinavia. It was completed in 1956.

The park contains an open-air theatre which was built from surplus earth from the construction of the Bellahøj Houses in the 1950s. It was designed by Carl Theodor Sørensen and seats 2,000 spectators.

In 1965, Copenhagen Municipality built an exhibition centre, Bella Center, which kept its name when it moved to its current location on Amager in 1975. The old building is now used as a sports centre under the name Grøndal MultiCenter.

Other buildings in the area include Bellahøj School, a hostel and Bellahøj Swimming Centre.

The park also contains three or four burial mounds from the Bronze Age.

In the southeastern corner is a small wooded area. The trees are mainly beech and ash.

The Copenhagen Historic Grand Prix auto race was held on the streets of Bellahøj from 2013 to 2025. The race was cancelled from 2026 onwards due to the installation of speed bumps and traffic islands on the former route of the race.
