= Striving Vines =

Danish pop/rock-band

- Origin: Denmark
- Genres: Pop, Alternative Rock
- Years active: 2008–present
- Members: Jonas Harsløf Møller; Jacob Haubjerg; Jens Bach Laursen; Michael Noe; Aske Bode
- Website: www.strivingvines.com

Striving Vines is a Danish pop/rock-band. The band consist of Jonas Harsløf Møller (vocals, guitar, keyboards), Jacob Haubjerg (bass, keyboards, guitar), Jens Bach Laursen (Drums, keyboards, percussion), Michael Noe (guitar) and Aske Bode (keyboards). They have released two studio albums, Can't win them all (2010) and Obstacles (2014).

Striving Vines was in the final at the 2008 Live Contest competition. They were widely recognized when they won a competition to warm-up for the Danish band Kashmir during a tour in 2010.
