= Start! Festival =

The Start! Festival is a music festival for up-and-coming Danish bands held annually in the Meatpacking District of Copenhagen, Denmark. First arranged in 2003, it showcases around 100 bands and soloists from the growth layer of Danish music.

== History ==
The festival was born in 2003 as a happening aiming to attract attention to the need for better practice facilities for bands in Copenhagen's Vesterbro district. This initiative developed into the Vesterbro Festival which gradually grew larger, in 2008 attracting 20,000 visitors. In the same time, the festival established as an important exhibition window for emerging bands, forming a serious alternative to the Århus-based SPOT Festival. To reflect this role and give the festival a more international profile, the name was changed to the current Start! Festival in 2009. In the same time, the programme was extended and various other initiatives taken, including the formation of the Start Academy, the festival's programme to promote the development of musical talent at band level.

== Stages ==
The festival currently has a total of six stages:

- A large outdoor stage
- Two indoor stages in Øksnehallen
- An electronica/club stage with an emphasis on visuals
- A Singer-songwriter
- A small hard rock stage

== Years ==
=== 2009 ===
The festival took place from 4 – 6 June and featured 100 bands selected among more than 1,200 applicant bands. Participating acts included Phil Shivers, Mislyd, Coco Moon and Ginger Ninja. Of established names, Johnny Deluxe, Mani Spinx and Mike Sheridan.

=== 2010 ===
The festival took place from 10 to 13 June and included 100 bands which had been selected from more than 1,200 bands through an internet-based selection process.

The festival opened on 10 June with Striving Vines and closed at 3 am on 13 June with Egger & Stunn. Some of the bands had already experienced airplay on Danish radio;including The Floor Is Made Of Lava, Alcoholic Faith Mission, Stoffer og Maskinen and The Wong Boys—while others are still fairly unknown.
