= Coat of arms of Copenhagen =

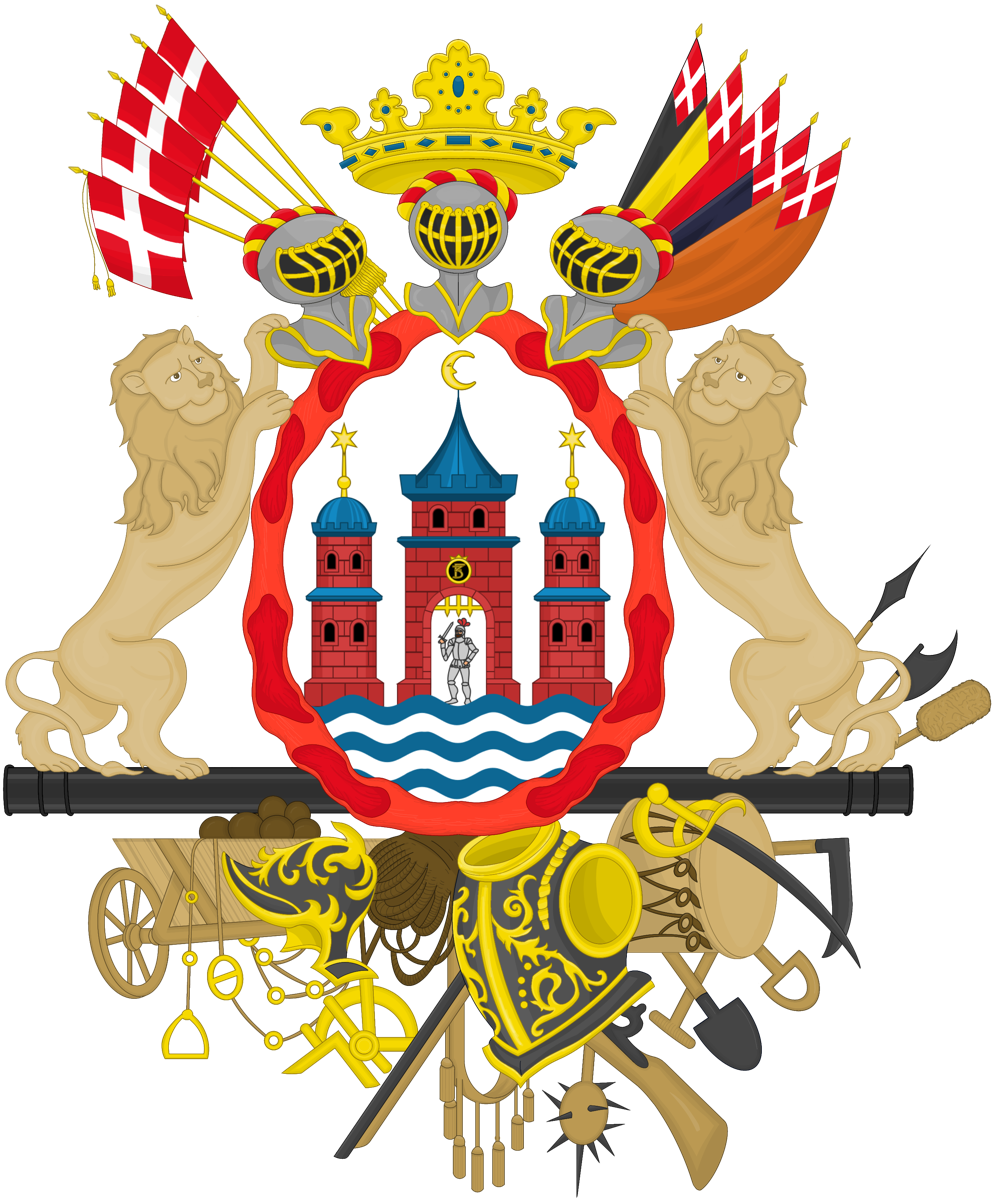

Versions
- Escutcheon-only
- Armiger: Copenhagen
- Adopted: 24 June 1661
- Supporters: Two lions rampant Proper armed and langued Gules
- Compartment: Cannon, with additional war equipment

The coat of arms of Copenhagen was granted (under its current form) on 24 June 1661 by king Frederick III of Denmark in appraisal of Copenhagen's citizen's efforts in repelling the Swedish siege and attack in 1658–1659. An accompanying royal letter of privilege granted the citizens of Copenhagen the same rights to own fixed property as applied to the Danish nobility.

The central feature of the full arms are three towers rising above water, a symbol also appearing in the town's seal from 1296. The water element refers to the city's original name Havn meaning "Harbour" (Latin: Hafnia). The left and right towers represent the castle of Absalon, while the central tower originally depicted a church building inside that castle. By the 16th century, the central tower was no longer depicted as a church tower; instead it had a gateway with a portcullis. The version granted by Frederick III modified the previous symbol by adding a knight carrying a raised sword in front of the gateway. The central tower features an oval with the king's F3 cypher above the city gate, both elements in gold.

The greater coat of arms features three helmets, banners and a wide assortment of military equipment. A golden crown is shown above, but not affixed to, the central helmet. Two lions act as supporters of the central escutcheon.
