= Copenhagen Carnival =

Annual event in Copenhagen, Denmark

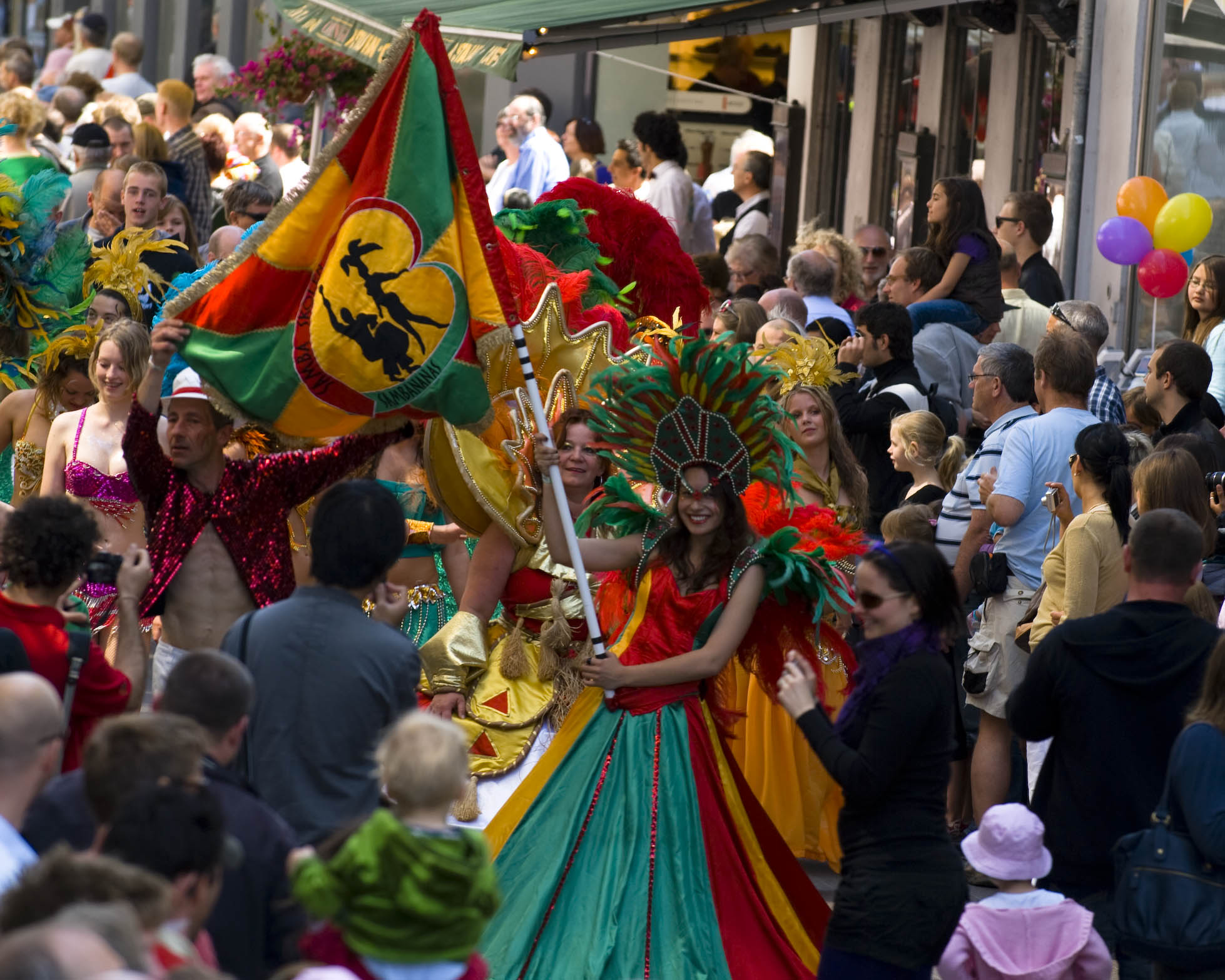
Dancers at Copenhagen Carnival 2009

Copenhagen Carnival is an annual carnival event taking place in Fælledparken and on the streets of Copenhagen, Denmark for three days (Friday-Sunday) during the Whitsun Holiday.

Over the years it has developed into the largest Danish festival for World music with 120 bands, 2000 dancers and more than 100,000 spectators participating.

== History ==
The first carnival in Copenhagen was arranged in 1982 by the "Carnival in May" association and attracted 500 dancers and 60,000 spectators.

== Events ==
The main venue of the carnival is Fælledparken with eight stages dedicated to various music genre. Apart from traditional samba and steelpan music, a number of other music styles are represented. The festival's main focus is world music but it also features an "electronic carnival" programme at the electronics stage.

The main Copenhagen Carnival Parade takes place on Saturday, moving from Kongens Nytorv to The City Hall Square along the pedestrian street Strøget. The day after, the parade is repeated in Fælledparken, leading up to the final evening of celebrations.

There is a special programme for children and young people with various workshops, performances and a separate parade. It originally took place in Rosenborg Castle Garden but has been moved to Fælledparken.
