= Brønshøj =

Suburb of Copenhagen, Denmark

- Suburb
- Location within Denmark
- Coordinates: 55°42′15″N 12°29′54″E
- Country: Denmark
- District: Brønshøj-Husum
- Municipality: Copenhagen

Brønshøj, part of the municipality of Copenhagen, forms, together with Husum, the administrative city district (bydel) of Brønshøj-Husum, in Denmark.

== History ==
The first mention of the village Brønshøj (Brunshoga), is in a letter dated October 21, 1186 from Pope Urban III to Archbishop Absalon. Brønshøj Church dates from approximately the same time.

In 1658-1660, during The Northern Wars, the village and its immediate surroundings were transformed into a military fortress and town, named Carlstad by the Swedish Army under the command of King Karl X Gustav. The population reached c. 30,000, comparable to the inhabitants of Copenhagen itself, consisted of mercenaries and their families, Swedes, Poles, Germans, Finns and persons from the Baltics and supported the Swedish siege of Copenhagen. The siege ended on the death of Karl X Gustav, 13 February 1660. Archeological evidence of the fortifications are not evident in the landscape today, though many artifacts have been uncovered. Artifacts and models of Carlstad and the events surrounding its creation, originally shown at Brønshøj Museum, now Rytterskolen, are presently spread between this location and Københavns Museum.

During end of the 19th century and early part of the 20th century, the rural village developed into a suburb of the growing metropolis of Copenhagen. In 1901, Brønshøj, together with several of the neighboring villages, was incorporated into the municipality of Copenhagen. Brønshøj contains some important examples of Danish housing types. In 1899, the cooperative housing area of Enigheden was begun as worker housing for the local, eponymous dairy. In 1923 by the English Garden Village was created. In the 1950s, Denmark's first significant high-rise housing project was built at Bellahøj. The great Danish landscape architect C.Th. Sørensen lived in one of the penthouses, known as rooftop villas, until his death. C.Th. Sørensen and architect Steen Eiler Rasmussen also planned the housing area Tingbjerg (near Utterslev Mose) between the late 1950s and early 1970s. It was based on the English contemporary concept of building a village within the city.

== Topography and Transport ==
Brønshøj lies 4 km west of Copenhagen center and is bordered by the large wetland area of Utterslev Mose and Tingbjerg to the north. A number of ponds, lakes, and parks characterise Brønshøj. Most of the neighborhood has an elevation of over 30 meters over sea level, with Bellahøj reaching 38 meters over the otherwise flat Copenhagen and so provides extensive views over wide parts of the city. This is a vantage point to view the Tivoli fireworks at midnight during the summer.

Today, Brønshøj is not served by the S-train and Metro networks, but the City bus connects the area to the center of Copenhagen, which can be reached within 20 minutes by car, bus or bicycle. The area has easy access to both the Ring 3 and the Hillerødmotorvej, major intercity highways.

In the most significant current development, small workshops, car lots and other single-storey buildings are being demolished and replaced with new housing blocks, often over shops, along Brønshøj's main street, Frederiksundsvej. However, the area maintains a distinctive character generated by its topography, parks, and housing architecture.

== Population ==
As of 2019 the population stands at c. 45,000 people. In the same year, 36.7% are immigrants or descendants of recent immigrants. Of these 8532 are from non-Western countries: 14% from Pakistan, 10% from Iraq, 8% from Somalia, 7% from Nepal and 6% from Turkey. An additional 2787 immigrants from Western countries came from Poland (20%) and 8% each from Bulgaria, Rumania and Germany.

The majority of the population consists of lower middle class households and approximately 30% of the houses are privately owned, many single family houses.

== Religious Institutions ==
Brønshøj houses 3 still-active churches: Brønshøj Kirke, Husumvold Kirke and Bellahøj Kirke. There are 3 major mosques located in Brønshøj, of these one Albanian.

== Sport ==
The soccer club Brønshøj Boldklub play at the Tingbjerg Idrætspark.

Former Danish handball champions IF Stadion is from Brønshøj.
