= Copenhagen Distortion =

Danish street music festival

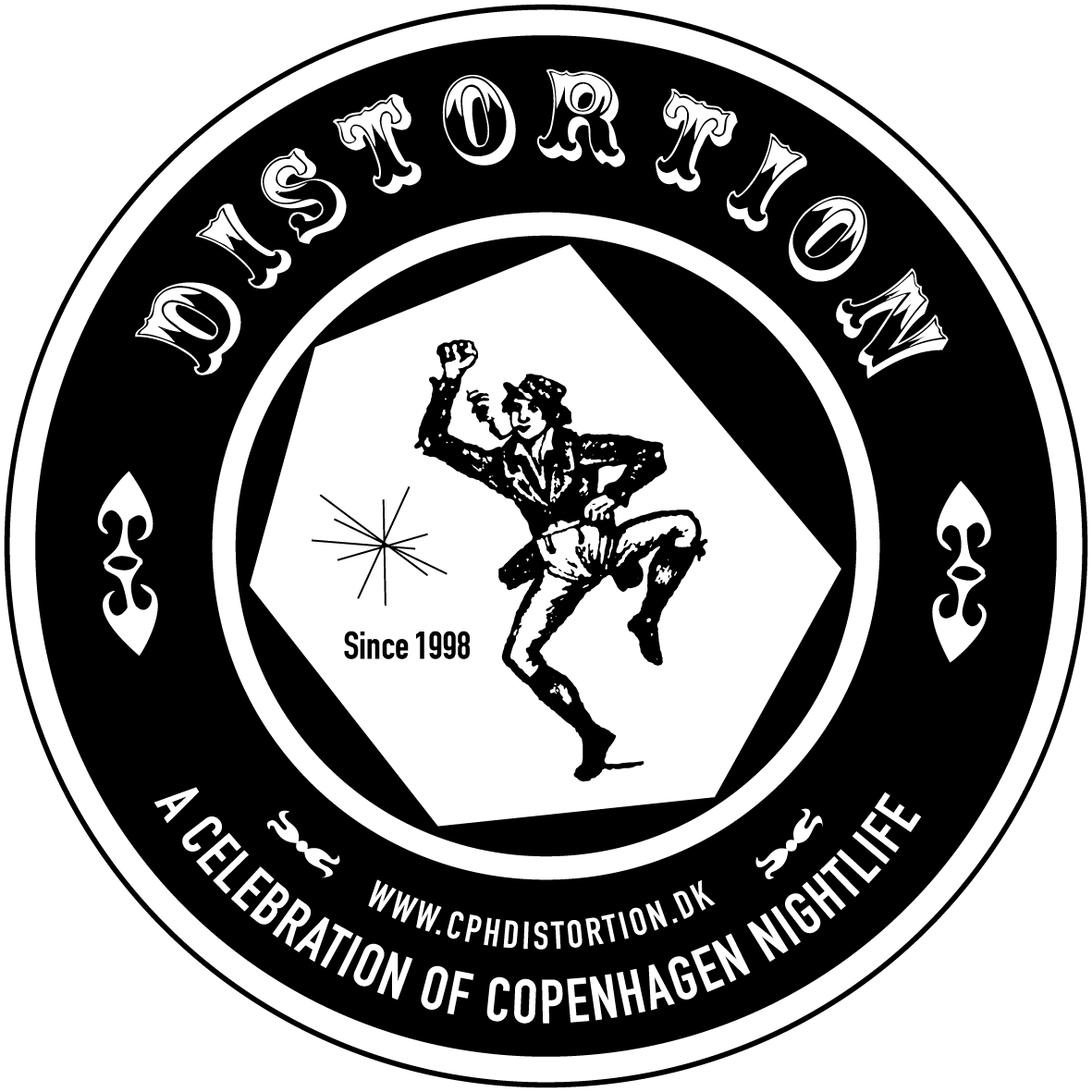
- Date: Week of first Saturday in June
- Frequency: Annual
- Locations: Copenhagen, Denmark
- Years active: 1998-present
- Attendance: ~100.000
- Budget: 20,000,000 DKK (2024)
- Organiser: Nus/Nus Secretariat nusnus.dk
- Website: www.cphdistortion.dk

Distortion is a celebration of "Street Life and New Dance Music" all over Copenhagen in the streets, venues, the harbour and a festival site. With over 100,000 visitors, it is one of the large annual gatherings in Europe, every year for a week ending on the first Saturday of June. The Distortion week includes free community street parties with 10-40 small stages per day in Nørrebro, Vesterbro and the Copenhagen Harbour, a few major street parties called Distortion X, and a bunch of night-time events in venues and nightclubs called Distortion Club. The weekend finale is called Distortion Ø, by far the largest electronic music event in Scandinavia: a rave with 4-8 stages on an industrial island of the Copenhagen harbour.

== History ==
The idea of ultra-mobility and the tag-line "Distortion — A Celebration of Copenhagen Nightlife" was born in September 1998 for a one-night party in the nightclub Mantra in Tivoli, Copenhagen, established by Thomas Fleurquin. Distortion became a five-day mobile festival in June 2000. Until 2007, Distortion was a small, chaotic, not-fully-legal five-day party-crawl through Copenhagen, mainly for the local underground art and music scene and for club culture professionals. In 2007, after gathering 2000 guests at a single street party for the first time, Distortion decided to go professional and entered a collaboration with the Copenhagen City Council and the Copenhagen Police: Nus/Nus – the Distortion Secretariat was established. In 2011, according to the Copenhagen Police, Distortion had 80,000-100,000 visitors per day, becoming one of the largest annual gatherings in Europe.

Distortion often invites local and international shops, labels, nightclubs, promoters, and magazines to host their own party through the week; over the years this has included Vice Magazine, Fabric – London, Resident Advisor, Adidas, Ed Bangers, Kompakt, Trouw – Amsterdam, Fact Magazine, and Red Bull Music Academy.

== Distortion Street, Distortion X, Distortion Club, Distortion Ø ==
=== Street parties ===
In the daytime, from 4:00 p.m. to 10:00 p.m., Distortion orchestrates 20-40 street parties, each day in one Copenhagen district: Nørrebro, Vesterbro or the Copenhagen Harbour. The street parties are hosted by local sound systems: shops, nightclubs, residents, galleries, labels, magazines, and bars. There are community events for children, pop-up street restaurants and there are often stages with classical music, dance, wrestling, art installations and a general anything goes attitude. The streets of Copenhagen are jam-packed, and transformed by the thousands of guests dancing and loving life and music together. The street parties are partly financed by the Gadearmbånd ('Street Wristband'), a voluntary donation (100 kr./€13) to support the production and cleaning of the street parties.

=== Distortion X ===
The major street parties happen behind a paywall since 2020. Distortion X is a festival for pop, hiphop, edm and other genres, presenting major Danish headliners. Distortion X are pop-up festival installations on main squares, boulevards, bridges, the Town Hall Square and other wide open public spaces in Copenhagen. Headliners are local and international artists with pop & club chart hits. Admission is with single Distortion X tickets or the Distortion Pass.

=== Distortion Club ===
At night, Distortion hosts an international festival for modern club music. Distortion Club takes place in nightclubs, regular venues and one-off locations like swimming pools, under bridges, in museums, the Royal Theatre, and warehouses. Partner-nightclubs include: Culture Box, Rust, Vega, Hotel Cecil, Arch, Den Anden Side, Module, H15 and many more. Admission is with single tickets or the Distortion Pass.

=== Distortion Ø ===
Distortion Ø is the weekend finale of the Distortion week, known until 2015 as the Final Party. With 12,000–14,000 guests per day, it is the largest electronic music event in Northern Europe. The labyrinth-like site is located on a former industrial island in the Copenhagen harbour called Refshaleøen. The backdrops combine the Copenhagen skyline and the industrial harbour zone. Admission is via the Distortion Ø ticket or Distortion Pass.

== See also ==
- List of electronic music festivals
