= Assault on Copenhagen (1659) =

Part of the Second Northern War

Coordinates: 55°40′34″N 12°34′06″E

- Part of Second Northern War
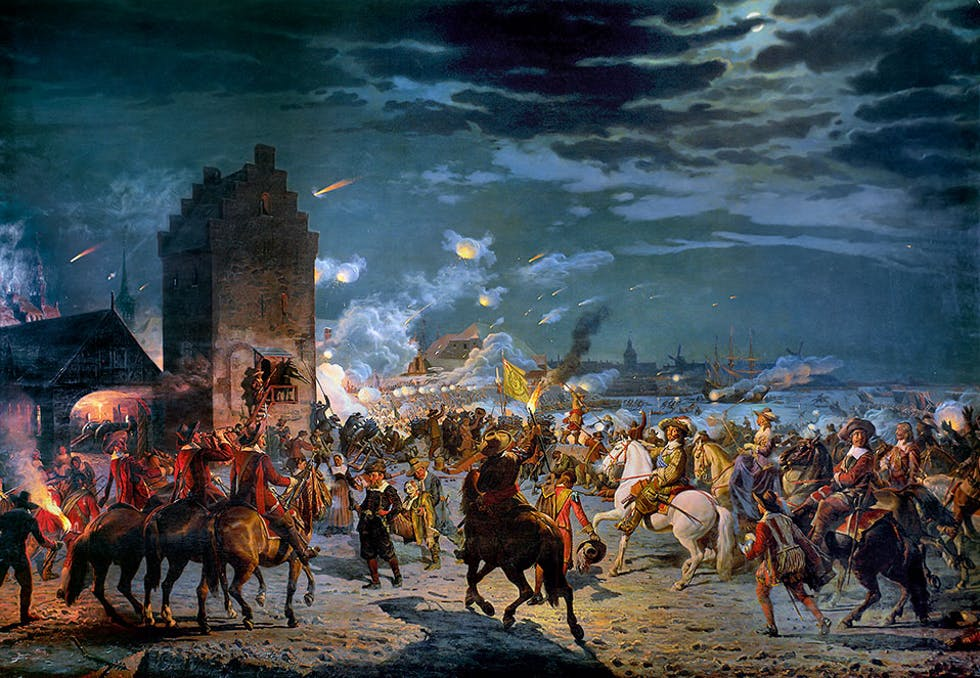
- Stormen på København 11 feb. 1659, Frederik Christian Lund
Date	11 February 1659
Location	Copenhagen, Denmark
Result	Dano-Dutch victory

Belligerents
Denmark–Norway; Dutch Republic	(yes) Swedish Empire

Commanders and leaders
Frederick III; Hans Schack	(yes) Charles X (yes) Gustaf Stenbock

Strength
10,650	8,000

Casualties and losses
19 killed and wounded	1,700 killed and wounded

The assault on Copenhagen (Danish: stormen på København; Swedish: stormningen av Köpenhamn), also known as the battle of Copenhagen, on 11 February 1659, was a major engagement during the Second Northern War, taking place during the Swedish siege of Copenhagen.

Following the arrival of Swedish forces on Zealand on 7 August 1658, they intended to attack Copenhagen, thus conquering Denmark. Upon their arrival to Copenhagen on 11 August, the Swedes decided to lay siege to the city instead of taking immediate military action. The Swedish unsuccessfully led an assault on the city on 11 February, which led to heavy losses and their eventual retreat. Although the Swedish forces were weakened, the siege itself lasted another year, not officially ending until the Treaty of Copenhagen was signed on 27 May 1660.

The successful defence of Copenhagen by the Dano-Dutch forces is not attributed by historians to their combined militaristic merits nor to the endurance of the city under siege. Instead, the outcome of the siege and the subsequent battle are attributed to the poor planning and rash actions taken by King Charles X Gustav of Sweden, who ultimately sent his forces to be cannon fodder.

== Background ==
During the Northern Wars, the Swedish army under Charles X, after invading the Danish mainland of Jutland, swiftly crossed the frozen straits in the March Across the Belts and occupied most of the Danish island of Zealand, with the invasion beginning on 11 February 1658. This forced the Danes to sue for peace. A preliminary treaty, the Treaty of Taastrup, was signed on 18 February 1658. The final Treaty of Roskilde, signed on 26 February 1658, granted Sweden major territorial gains. Through the treaty, Denmark ceded all of its territory east of the Øresund as well as the Norwegian counties of Bohuslän and Trondheim, constituting a third of its total territory.

The Swedish king, however, was not content with his stunning victory. At the Privy Council held at Gottorp on 7 July, Charles X resolved to conquer the entirety of Denmark. Without any warning and in defiance of the international treaty, he ordered his troops to attack Denmark–Norway a second time. Swedish forces had never left Denmark after the treaty was signed and already occupied all of Denmark apart from the capital, Copenhagen.

Denmark relied on its allies against Sweden for its defence. Poland and Brandenburg sent armies to Jutland, while The Netherlands sent a fleet to the besieged capital.

== Siege ==
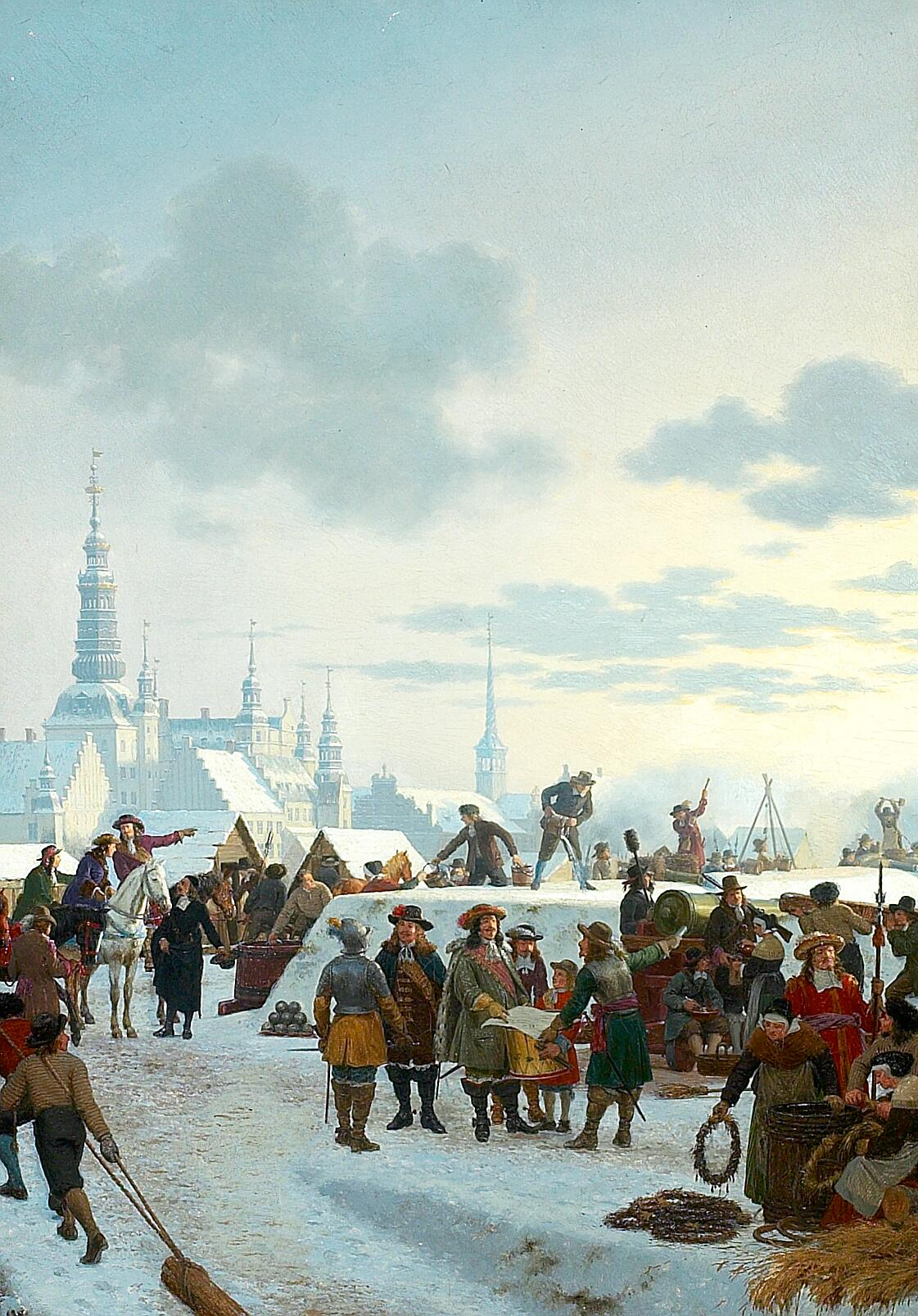
Heinrich Hansen's 1886 painting, En scene fra Københavns belejring (English: A scene from Copenhagen's siege), which depicts the Danes preparing the defences of the city

Swedish forces landed at Korsør on 7 August 1658. News of the approaching forces reached Copenhagen the next day and were met with widespread calls to flee. King Frederick III of Denmark chose to hold his ground and remain, reportedly stating that he would "die in his nest" (Danish: dø i sin rede). On 10 August, he organized the defence of the city by offering its inhabitants privileges that equated them with the nobility. Through their combined labor and credit, he rapidly prepared the city's fortifications.

Also on 10 August, a Swedish fleet of 28 ships blockaded the port of Copenhagen. On the evening of 11 August Charles X and his forces reached Valby hill (current day Frederiksberg) from where they could overlook the Danish capital. Frederick III had already ordered every building outside the city walls to be burned down, even though it had housed a third of the city's population. That same day, the city gates were closed and would not open again for another 22 months.

When the Swedish king arrived to find half the city in flames and the Danes willing to put up a fight he had a difficult decision to make, whether to press forward immediately or whether to lay siege on the city and try to starve it out. His advisers were divided on the issue, and the king ultimately decided on the latter route. The wisdom of this decision has been questioned, since the Danish defences were already in poor condition. However, the population of Copenhagen rallied behind Frederick III, and the walls, moats and other defensive structures of the city were quickly improved. A large number of cannons were brought into the city from ships anchored in the harbor and placed along likely attack routes. The city also had a sizeable reserve of defensive materiel: 50 tonnes (110,000 lb) of lead, 4,000 muskets, and a staggering 810 kilometres (500 mi) of slow match.

The Swedish siege force consisted of 11 brigades and 16 squadrons comprising 4,000 infantry, 2,000 cavalry and 50 cannons. The Swedish fired over 200 heated shot a day into the city, and several large howitzers were brought to bombard the Danish capital, including the 300-pounder "Eric Hansson", earlier used in the siege of Kraków. The citizens of Copenhagen endured the constant barrage and its fire service managed to subdue Swedish efforts to set the city on fire. Swedish positions were fired at from the city's rampart and from fortified barges in Kalvebod Brygge and near Kastellet fort.

The Swedes took the outer defensive perimeter, built in 1625 by Christian IV, which had fallen into disrepair. It was hastily repaired and artillery was brought to bear on the city. In response, the Danes made several counter-attacks. On August 23, 1658, almost 3,000 students, sailors and soldiers staged a surprise sortie through a hidden passage in the wall, destroying fortifications under construction and capturing three cannons. This sortie would later become known as "Generaludfaldet" within Danish history.

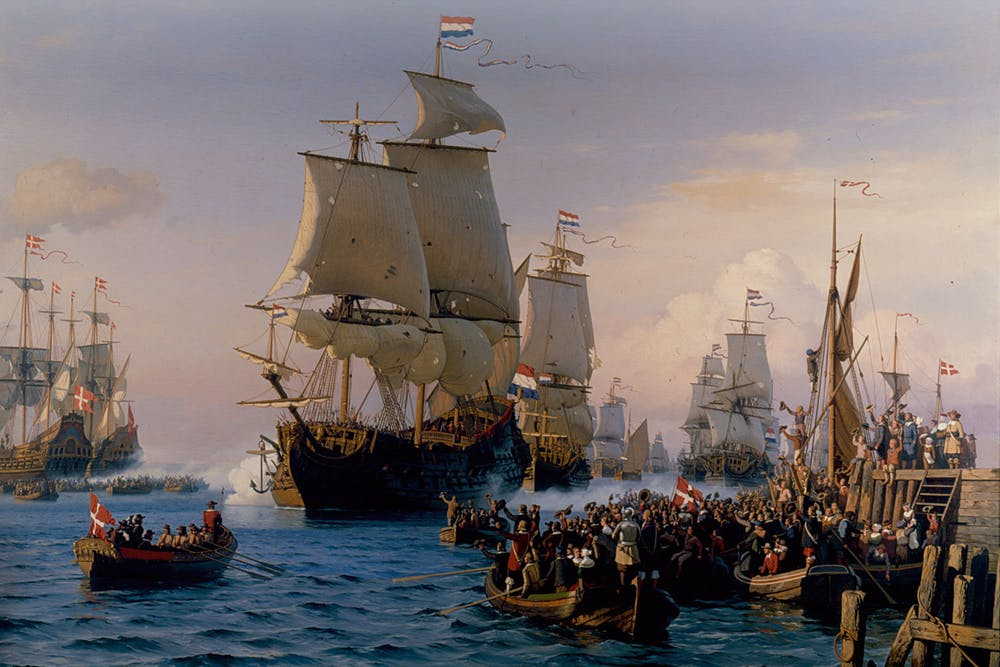
The Dutch fleet arriving in Copenhagen

Outside of Copenhagen, the Swedes captured Kronborg on 6 September and attacked Amager on 8 October, exacerbating the city's supply struggles. The Swedish had begun building trenches towards Vesterport, from where they planned to initiate an assault on the city. Before the trench was complete, however, a Dutch relief fleet arrived under Lieutenant-Admiral Jacob van Wassenaer Obdam leading to the Battle of the Sound on 29 October 1658. The resulting victory lifted the sea blockade and allowed about 2,000 Dutch soldiers and supplies to reach the capital.

Following their defeat at the Battle of the Sound, the Swedes abandoned their trenches towards Vesterport and their camp at Valby, instead establishing Carlstad, a new, fortified camp at Brønshøj from which they maintained the siege. These initial three months of the siege were its most decisive phase, as there was little action between November 1658 and February 1659.

== Opposing forces ==
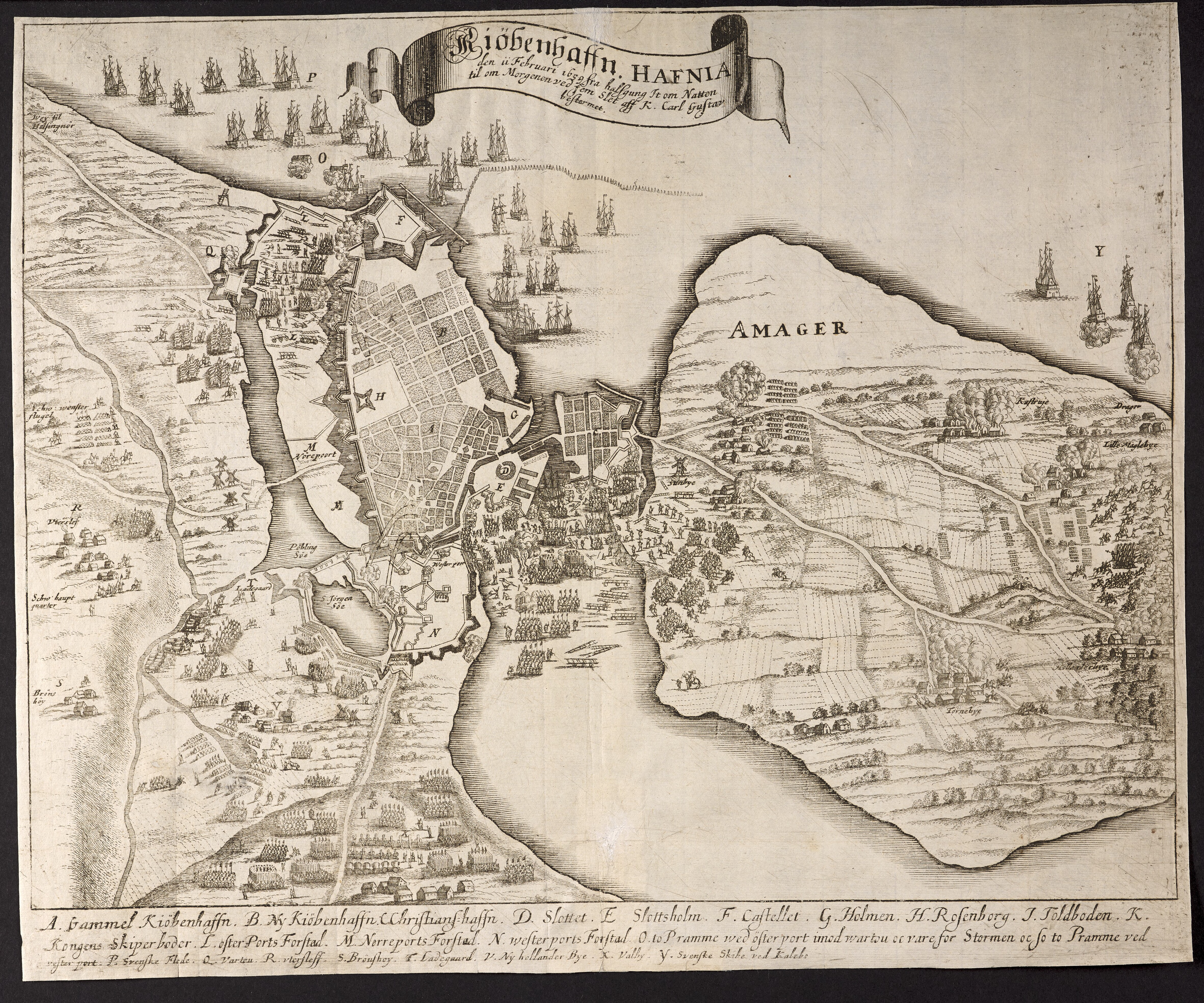
Map of Copenhagen on 11 February 1650.

After the Copenhageners had withstood about six months of siege, bombardments and attacks, the Swedes attempted to take the city by a grand assault, as a prolonged siege no longer offered any hope of success now that the sea lanes had been opened by the Dutch. Danish spies learned that the attack was to take place on the night of 10 February, and warned the Copenhageners who planned their defences and stockpiled weapons and ammunition.

The walls of Copenhagen bristled with about 300 pieces of cannon, mortars and other artillery, while a diverse mixture of weapons, ranging from muskets and arquebuses to morningstars, scythes, boiling water and tar had been readied for action. Craftsmen, students and other civilians were divided into nine companies, and each of these companies was allocated a part of the wall to defend. The professional soldiers were stationed at the outer field works, Kastellet and Slotsholmen. The Dutch had a force of 2000 soldiers in the city. The Swedish army consisted of about 8,000 professional soldiers, while the Danish forces, a mixture of professionals, militia and raw civilians, were of an equal number.

== Assault ==
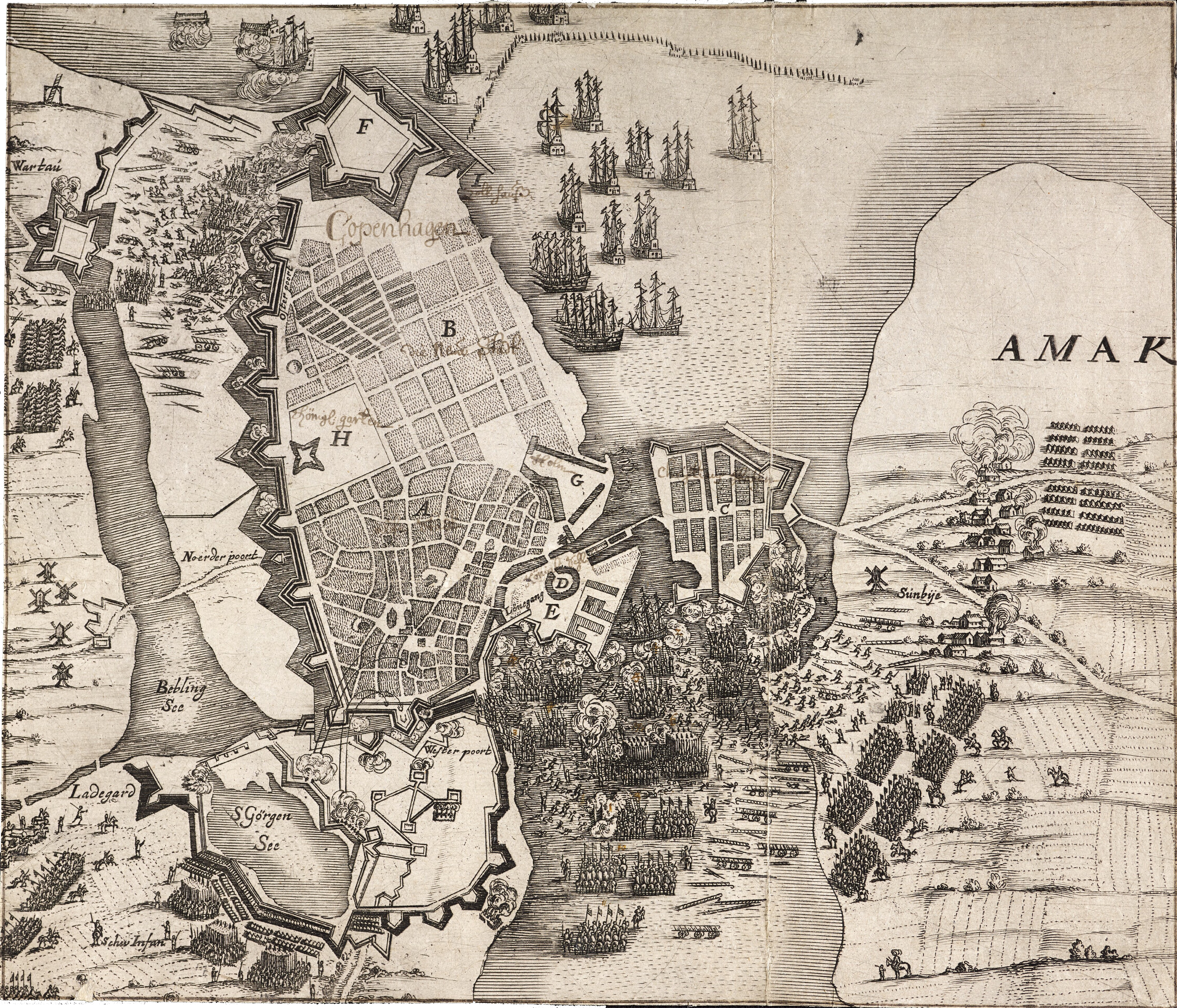
Contemporary illustration of the battle

The Swedes started the action by making a diversionary attack at Christianshavn and Slotsholmen on the evening of 9 February. They were repulsed, and the Swedes left one of their assault bridges behind, which the Danes captured and measured. They found that the Swedish assault bridges were 36 feet long, and thus they realised that they could render these bridges useless by making the ice-free parts of the moats wider. The moats and the beaches had been kept free of ice, and now the ice free zones were widened to 44 feet with help from 600 Dutch marines. The ice was thick, and the work was done in heavy snowfall from 4 o'clock in the afternoon till evening on 10 February.

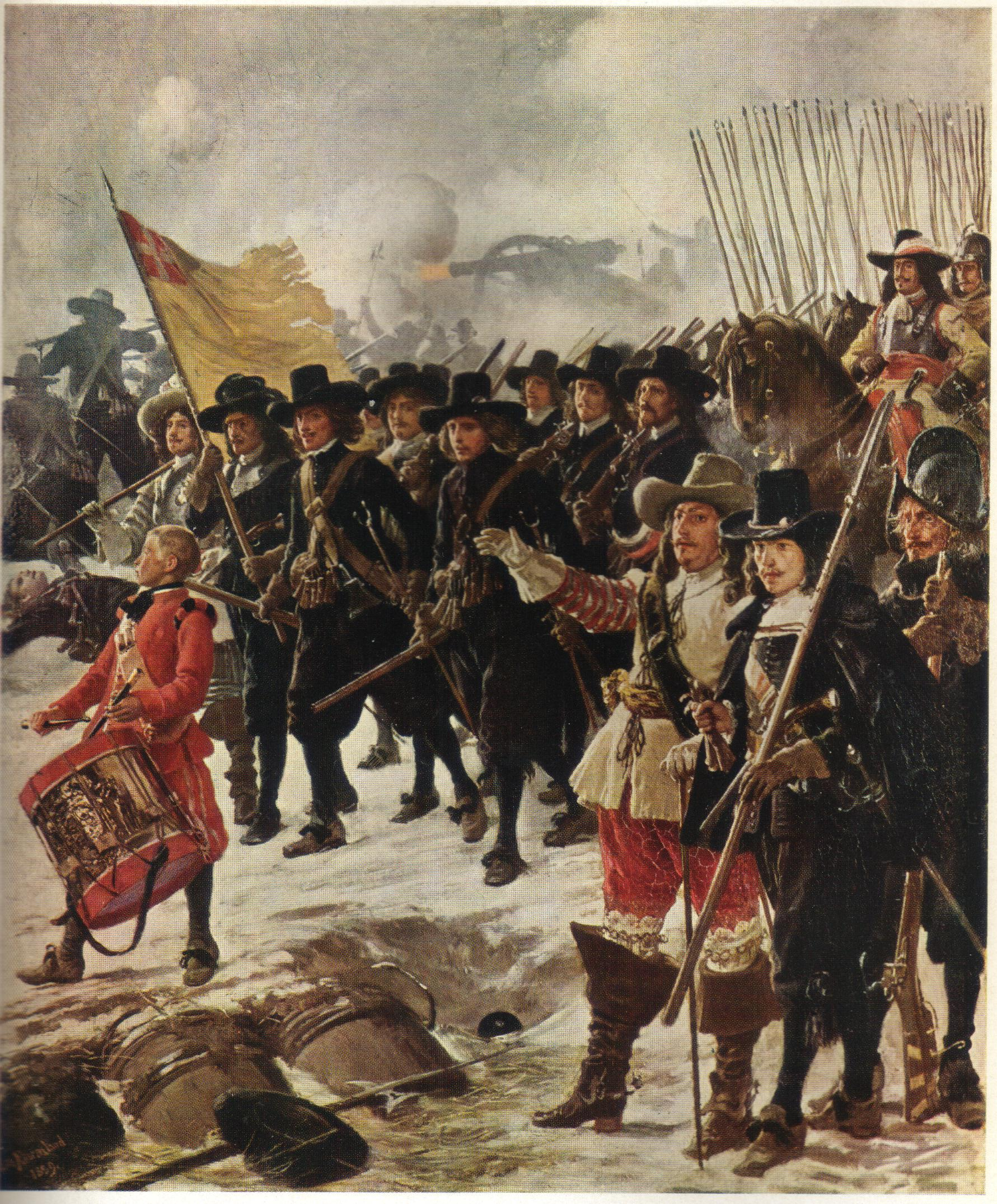
Students participating in the defence of Copenhagen on the night between 10 and 11 February 1659, painted by Vilhelm Rosenstand in 1889

Danish spies reported that the Swedish army had moved from their camp, Carlstad, at Brønshøj and had taken up positions behind Valby Hill. The Swedes, intending to make a surprise attack, had dressed in white clothing to blend in with the snow and fog as they advanced across the frozen strait towards Copenhagen. When the Swedes began their assault about midnight the same evening, they met heavy resistance.

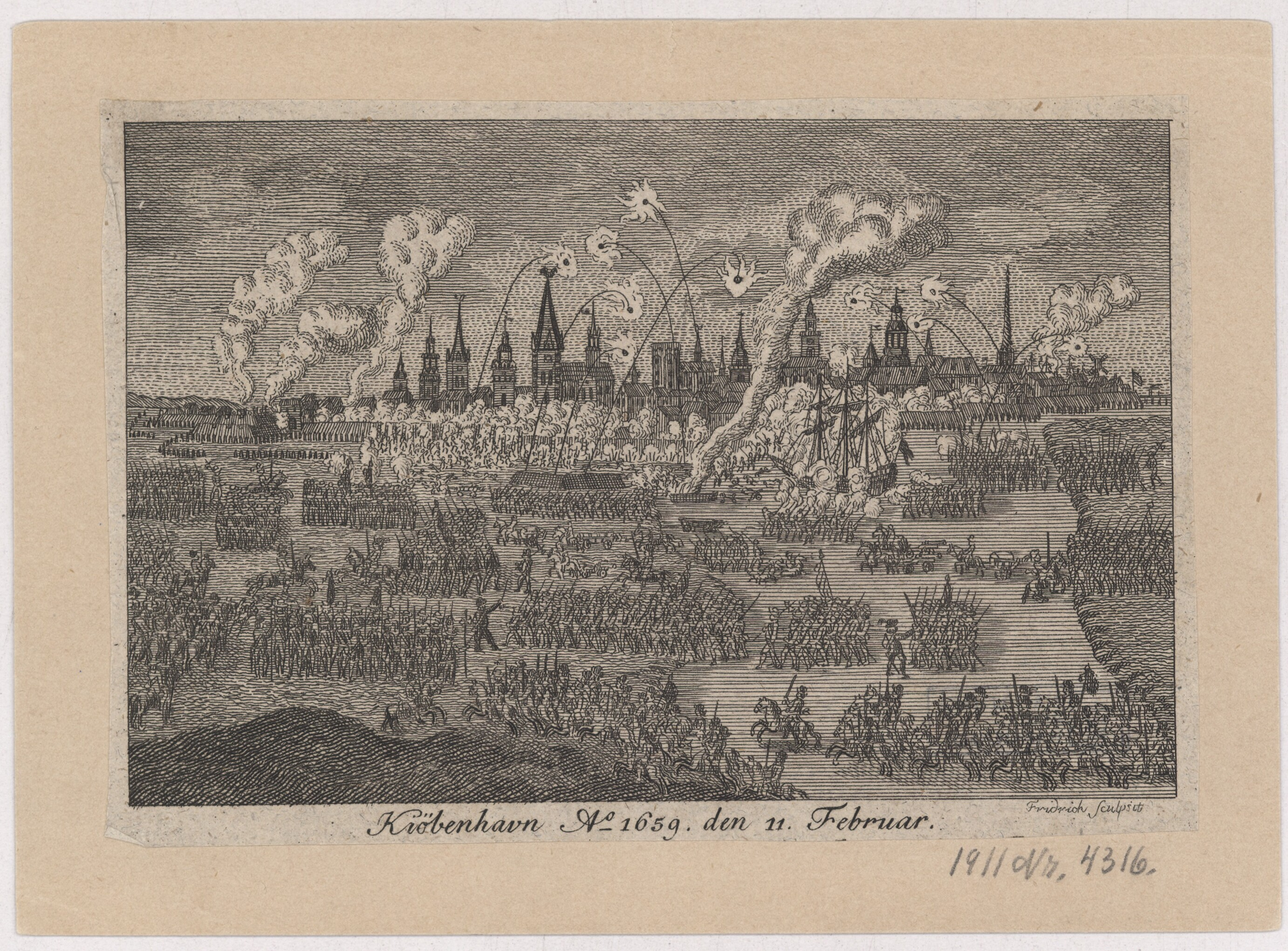
The Assault on Copenhagen on 11 February.

The main assaults were made against Christianshavn and Vestervold, but the chopped-up ice and the massed weaponry on the wall caused the Swedish forces to take a horrific number of casualties. Still, they fought their way to the top of the wall, and fierce hand-to-hand fighting broke out. When the Swedes realised that the assaults on the Western part of the wall were in trouble, the choice was made to make a supporting attack at Østerport. The Swedes got very close to Nyboder and were in the process of crossing the moat, when they fell victim to an ambush and withdrew with heavy losses.

== Aftermath ==
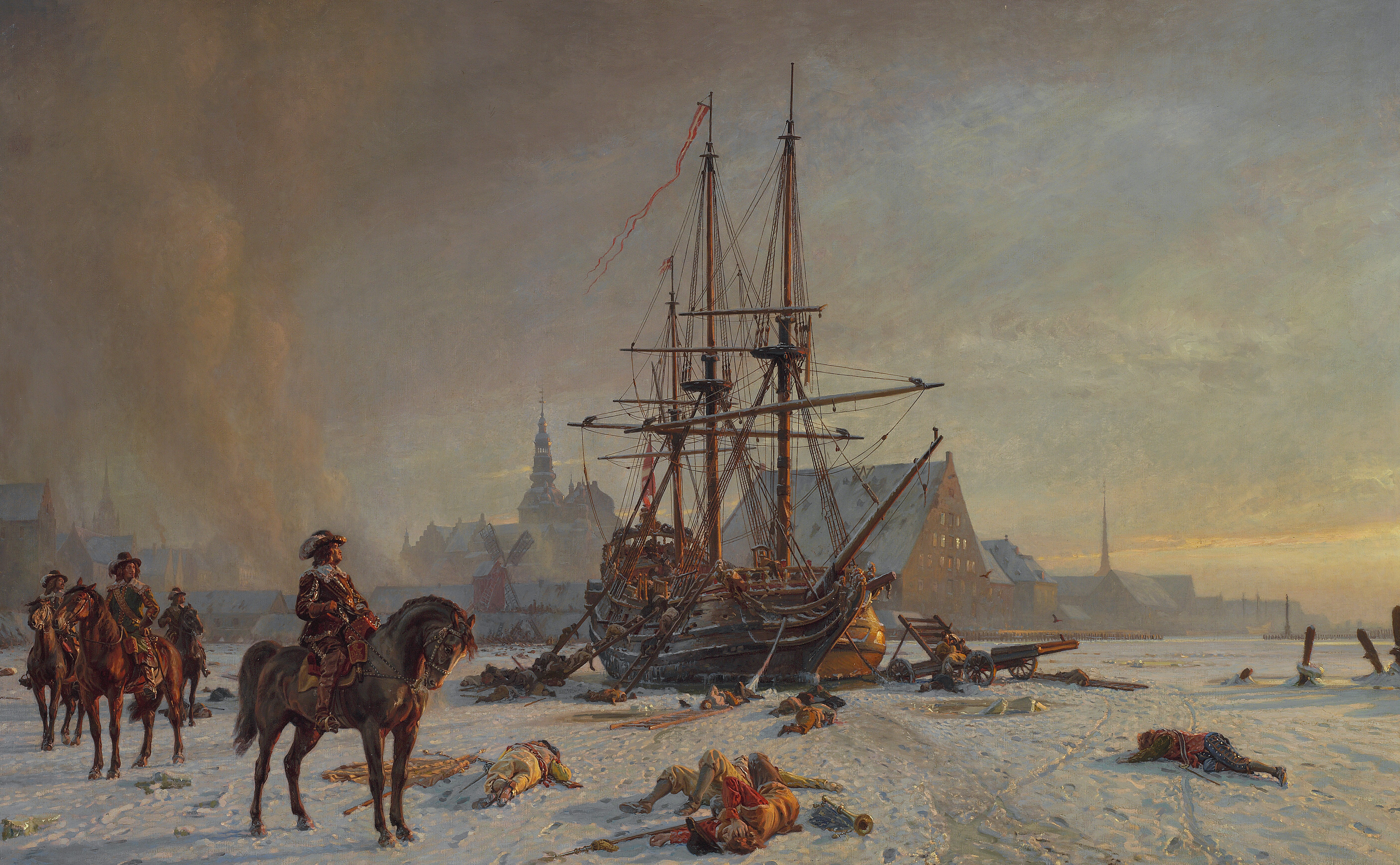
The morning after the assault on Copenhagen, 1659, painted by Christian Mølsted in 1919

At about five in the morning on 11 February the Swedes gave up and retreated. They had taken severe losses, with around 2,000 dead. Beyond Copenhagen's walls, 600 bodies were counted, though many more had perished in the ice-cold water and were never found. Many more were wounded, with at least 900 wounded sent to Köge and Roskilde for treatment. The Danes had only suffered about 20 dead.

Although the Swedish forces had retreated, the siege of the capital continued. The Dutch in the spring of 1659 sent a second fleet and army under Vice-Admiral De Ruyter to further reinforce the city and cut the Swedish supply lines so that the siege would have to be lifted altogether. After Nyborg had been taken by a Dutch-Danish force in the Battle of Nyborg, the Danish Isles were completely abandoned by the Swedes.

On 24 March 1659, Frederick III enacted the expanded privileges he had promised Copenhagen's citizens in exchange for their fortification of the city. Because this gave common citizens privileges previously reserved only for the nobility, it added to the growing tensions between the monarchy and the nobility. These tensions eventually culminated in the 1660 state of emergency in Denmark.

Although the Dano-Dutch victory in Copenhagen forced Charles X to abandon ambitions of a complete conquest of Denmark, it was not the impetus for peace negotiations. It was only following the death of Charles X that the regency council of his successor, King Charles XI, immediately began efforts to end the war on all fronts. Negotiations were opened and the Treaty of Copenhagen was signed on 27 May 1660, marking the conclusion of the Second Northern War between Sweden and the alliance of Denmark-Norway and the Polish–Lithuanian Commonwealth. Through the treaty, Sweden ceded its claims to the Danish Isles, Bornholm, and Trondheim in exchange for freedom of transit through the Danish-controlled straits. In conjunction with the Treaty of Roskilde, it ended a generation of warfare and established the present-day borders of Denmark and Sweden.

== Legacy ==
In 1659, coins were minted celebrating the successful defence of the city which attributed its preservation to God's intervention. February 11th was made a permanent and mandatory holiday in 1660 as the Taksigelsesfesten (English: Feast of Thanksgiving). The holiday was a day of remembrance, commemorated by bell ringing, sermons, and mandatory church attendance. Taksigelsesfesten was celebrated annually until 1766, when it was abolished following the marriage of the King's daughter, Sophia Magdalena, to the crown prince of Sweden, Gustav III.

== See also ==
- Battle of the Sound
- Fortifications of Copenhagen (17th century)
