= Prince Christian of Schaumburg-Lippe =

German prince (1898-1974)

Prince Christian
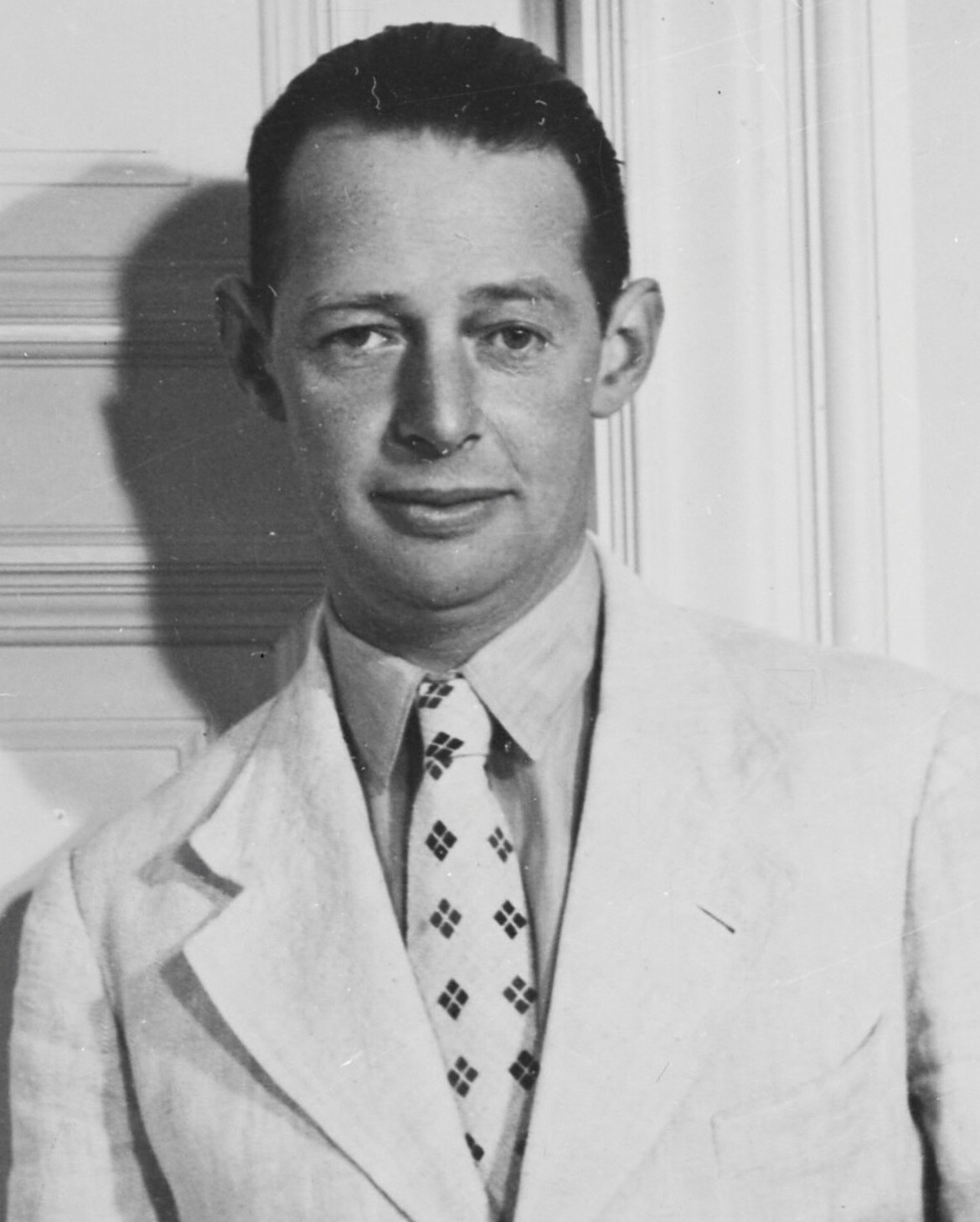
- Christian in 1937
- Born: 20 February 1898; Sopron (Ödenburg), Hungary
- Died: 13 July 1974 (aged 76); Bückeburg, West Germany
- Spouse: Princess Feodora of Denmark (m. 1937)
- Issue: Prince William; Prince Waldemar; Princess Marie; Prince Harald
Names
- German: Christian Nikolaus Wilhelm Friedrich Albert Ernst
- House: Lippe
- Father: Prince Frederick of Schaumburg-Lippe
- Mother: Princess Louise of Denmark

Prince Christian Nikolaus of Schaumburg-Lippe (German: Christian Nikolaus Prinz zu Schaumburg-Lippe; 20 February 1898 – 13 July 1974) was a German prince and head of the Náchod branch of the princely house of Schaumburg-Lippe.

== Life ==
=== Early life ===
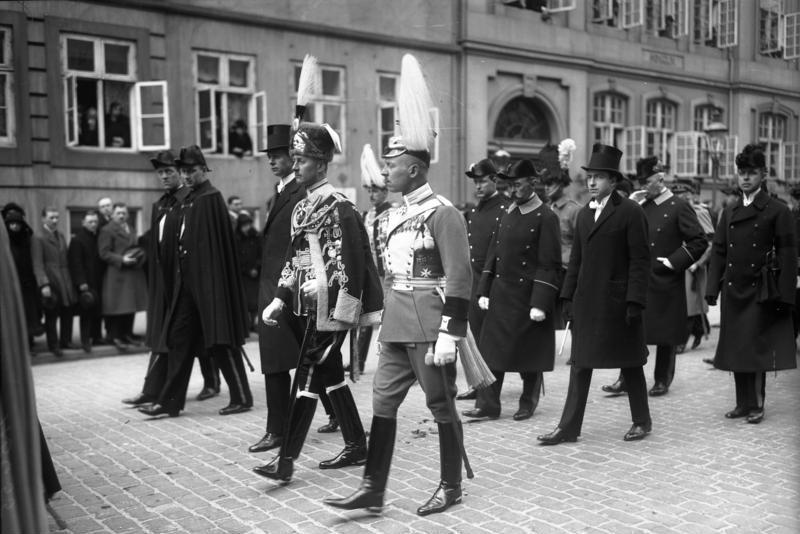
Prince Christian (in grey German military uniform) at the funeral of his grandmother, the late Danish Queen Mother, in 1926, alongside his brother-in-law Prince Friedrich Sigismund of Prussia (in black German cavalry uniform).

He was born on 20 February 1898 in Sopron, Hungary, as the only son and second child of Frederick of Schaumburg-Lippe and his first wife Princess Louise of Denmark, younger sister of King Christian X of Denmark.

=== War ===
In World War I, Prince Christian served as an officer of the Imperial German Army and was awarded both classes of the Iron Cross, among other decorations.

=== Later life ===
Together with his wife, he took part in the ship tour organized by Queen Frederica and her husband King Paul of Greece in 1954, which became known as the "Cruise of the Kings" and was attended by over 100 royals from all over Europe. He died aged 76 on 13 July 1974 at Bückeburg, a year before his wife.

== Marriage and issue ==
In 1927, his engagement to Princess Irene of Greece and Denmark, a daughter of Constantine I of Greece was announced. However, nothing went as planned. She later married Prince Aimone of Savoy-Aosta.

He was also briefly considered as a marriage candidate for Princess Juliana, the heiress to the Dutch throne. They had met each other in 1932 in Mecklenburg, home of Juliana’s paternal relations. Although his reputation as a womanizer, his previous called off engagement and his German heritage did not make him a popular choice, he was reconsidered after other candidates were rejected by the Queen or Juliana herself. These plans, however, did not prove fruitful either.

On 9 September 1937, he married his cousin, Princess Feodora, daughter of his maternal uncle Prince Harald of Denmark who was a younger brother of King Christian X and Princess Louise, at Fredensborg Palace, Zealand, Denmark; they had four children.

- Prince Wilhelm of Schaumburg-Lippe (19 August 1939 – 9 July 2026); married in 1970 Ilona Freiin Hentschel von Gilgenheimb (1940-2023)
  - Prince Christian of Schaumburg-Lippe (b. 1971); married in 2009 Lena Giese.
  - Princess Desiree of Schaumburg-Lippe (b. 1974); married Michael Iuel and has three children.
- Prince Waldemar of Schaumburg-Lippe (19 December 1940 - 11 August 2020). He married four times. He had one daughter with his first wife:
  - Princess Eleonore-Christine Eugenie Benita Feodora Maria of Schaumburg-Lippe (b. 22 December 1978)
- Princess Marie-Louise of Schaumburg-Lippe (27 December 1945 - 2 September 2025). Died unmaried without issue.
- Prince Harald of Schaumburg-Lippe (b. 27 March 1948). Never married without issue.

== Ancestry ==
Ancestors of Prince Christian of Schaumburg-Lippe

8. George William, Prince of Schaumburg-Lippe
4. Prince William of Schaumburg-Lippe
9. Princess Ida of Waldeck and Pyrmont
2. Prince Frederick of Schaumburg-Lippe
10. Prince Frederick Augustus of Anhalt-Dessau
5. Princess Bathildis of Anhalt-Dessau
11. Princess Marie Luise Charlotte of Hesse-Kassel
1. Prince Christian of Schaumburg-Lippe
12. Christian IX of Denmark
6. Frederick VIII of Denmark
13. Princess Louise of Hesse-Kassel
3. Princess Louise of Denmark
14. Charles XV of Sweden
7. Princess Louise of Sweden
15. Princess Louise of the Netherlands
