= Princess Adelaide of Schaumburg-Lippe =

Duchess of Saxe-Altenburg from 1908 to 1918

Princess Adelaide
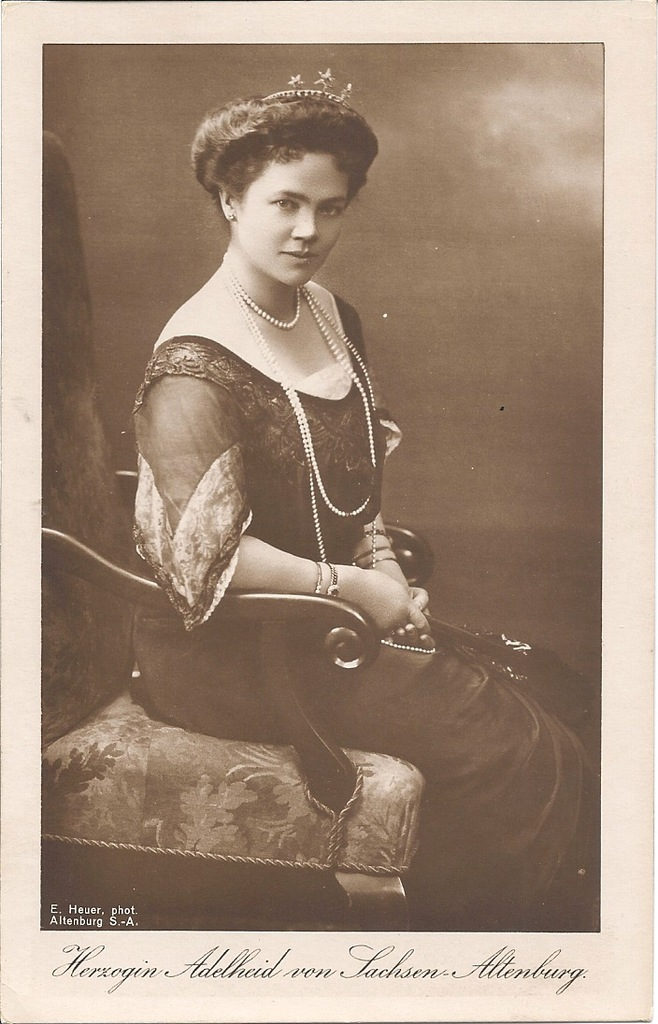
- Photo of Duchess Adelaide of Saxe-Altenburg

Duchess consort of Saxe-Altenburg
- Tenure: 7 February 1908 – 13 November 1918
- Born: 22 September 1875; Ratibořice, Kingdom of Bohemia
- Died: 27 January 1971 (aged 95); Ballenstedt, East Germany
- Spouse: Ernst II, Duke of Saxe-Altenburg (m. 1898; div. 1920)
- Issue Detail: Charlotte, Princess Sigismund of Prussia; Georg Moritz, Hereditary Prince of Saxe-Altenburg; Princess Elisabeth; Prince Frederick
Names
- German: Friederike Adelheid Marie Luise Hilda Eugenie zu Schaumburg-Lippe
- House: Lippe
- Father: Prince William of Schaumburg-Lippe
- Mother: Princess Bathildis of Anhalt-Dessau

Princess Adelaide of Schaumburg-Lippe (German: Prinzessin Friederike Adelheid Marie Luise Hilda Eugenie zu Schaumburg-Lippe; 22 September 1875 – 27 January 1971) was the daughter of Prince William of Schaumburg-Lippe and consort of the last reigning Duke of Saxe-Altenburg Ernst II.

== Early life and ancestry ==
Adelaide was born at Ratiboritz castle in the Kingdom of Bohemia (now Ratibořice), into the Schaumburg-Lippe branch of the House of Lippe.

She was the seventh child and third daughter of Prince William of Schaumburg-Lippe, (son of George William, Prince of Schaumburg-Lippe and Princess Ida of Waldeck and Pyrmont) and his wife, Princess Bathildis of Anhalt-Dessau, (daughter of Prince Frederick Augustus of Anhalt-Dessau and Princess Marie Luise Charlotte of Hesse-Kassel).

In 1891, her eldest sister Princess Charlotte married William II of Württemberg, as his second wife, and became Queen Consort of the Kingdom of Württemberg.

== Marriage ==
Adelaide married 17 February 1898 at Bückeburg to Prince Ernst of Saxe-Altenburg, member of the Ernestine branch of the House of Wettin, an only son of Prince Moritz of Saxe-Altenburg, and his wife, Princess Augusta of Saxe-Meiningen.

Soon after the collapse of the German Empire and the Duchy of Saxe-Altenburg, their marriage ended in divorce, on 17 January 1920.

They had four children, two sons and two daughters:

1. Princess Charlotte (Potsdam, 4 March 1899 – Hemmelmark bei Eckernförde, 16 February 1989); married on 11 July 1919 Prince Sigismund of Prussia and had issue. Charlotte and Sigismund are the maternal grandparents of Donata Mecklenburg-Solodkoff.
2. Georg Moritz, Hereditary Prince of Saxe-Altenburg (Potsdam, 13 May 1900 – Rendsburg, 13 February 1991), never married, no issue.
3. Princess Elisabeth Karola (Potsdam, 6 April 1903 – Breiholz, 30 January 1991), never married, no issue.
4. Prince Frederick Ernst (Potsdam, 15 May 1905 – Rosenheim, 23 February 1985), never married, no issue.

== Death ==
Princess Antoinette of Schaumburg-Lippe died on 27 January 1971, in Ballenstedt, East Germany, aged 95.

Her body was buried in the Mausoleumgarten, Bückeburg, Germany.

== Ancestry ==
Ancestors of Princess Adelaide of Schaumburg-Lippe

8. Philip II Ernest, Count of Schaumburg-Lippe
4. George William, Prince of Schaumburg-Lippe
9. Landgravine Juliane of Hesse-Philippsthal
2. Prince William of Schaumburg-Lippe
10. George I, Prince of Waldeck and Pyrmont
5. Princess Ida of Waldeck and Pyrmont
11. Princess Auguste of Schwarzburg-Sondershausen
1. Princess Adelaide of Schaumburg-Lippe
12. Frederick, Hereditary Prince of Anhalt-Dessau
6. Prince Frederick Augustus of Anhalt-Dessau
13. Landgravine Amalie of Hesse-Homburg
3. Princess Bathildis of Anhalt-Dessau
14. Prince William of Hesse-Kassel
7. Princess Marie Luise Charlotte of Hesse-Kassel
15. Princess Louise Charlotte of Denmark

== Notes and sources ==
- L'Allemagne dynastique, Huberty, Giraud, Magdelaine, Reference: II 295
- Genealogisches Handbuch des Adels, Fürstliche Häuser, Reference: 1961

Princess Adelaide of Schaumburg-Lippe House of Lippe Born: 22 September 1875 Died: 27 January 1971
German royalty
Preceded by Agnes of Anhalt-Dessau	Duchess consort of Saxe-Altenburg; 7 February 1908 – 13 November 1918	Succeeded by Duchy abolished
Titles in pretence
Loss of title	— TITULAR — Duchess consort of Saxe-Altenburg; 13 November 1918 – 17 January 1920; Reason for succession failure: Duchy abolished in 1918	Succeeded by None
