= Prince Frederick of Schaumburg-Lippe =

German prince (1868–1945)

Prince Frederick
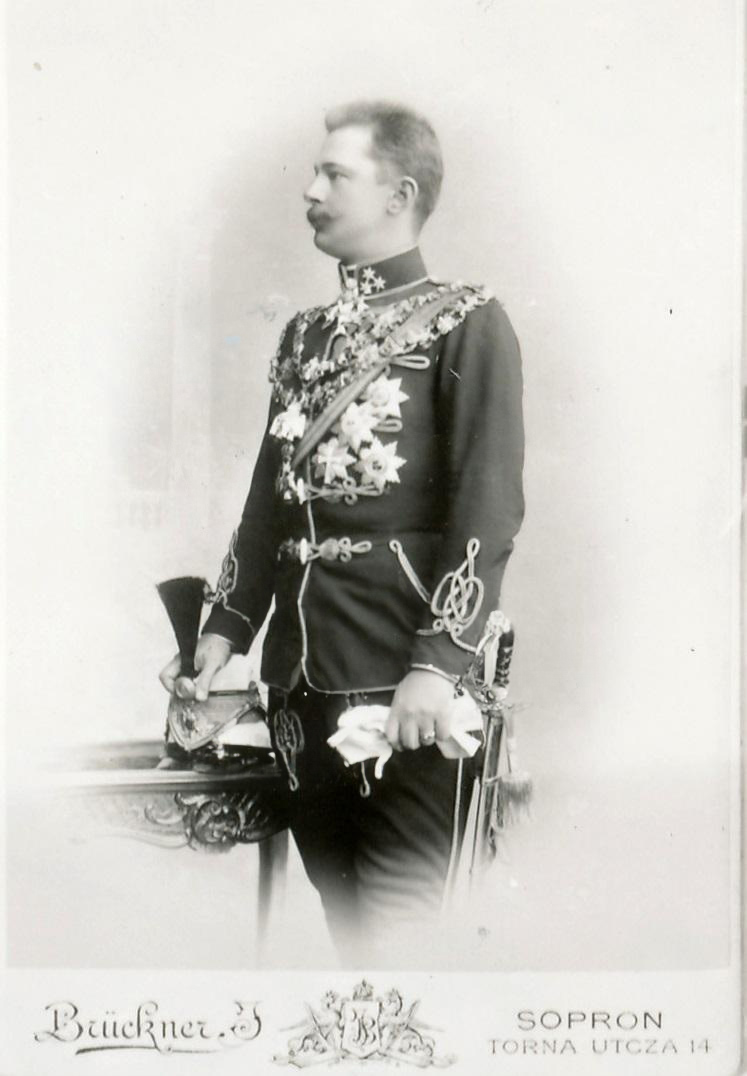
- Prince Frederick in a photo of early 20th century
- Born: 30 January 1868; Ratibořice Castle, Bohemia, Austria-Hungary
- Died: 12 December 1945 (aged 77); Kudowa-Zdrój, Silesia, Poland
- Spouse: Princess Louise of Denmark (m. 1896; died 1906) Princess Antoinette of Anhalt (m. 1909)
- Issue: Marie Louise, Princess Friedrich Sigismund of Prussia; Prince Christian; Stephanie, Princess of Bentheim and Steinfurt; Prince Leopold; Prince William
Names
- German: Friedrich Georg Wilhelm Bruno
- House: Lippe
- Father: Prince William of Schaumburg-Lippe
- Mother: Princess Bathildis of Anhalt-Dessau

Prince Frederick of Schaumburg-Lippe (German: Prinz Friedrich Georg Wilhelm Bruno zu Schaumburg-Lippe; 30 January 1868 – 12 December 1945) was a German prince and head of the Náchod branch of the princely house of Schaumburg-Lippe.

He was a son of Prince William of Schaumburg-Lippe by his wife, Princess Bathildis of Anhalt-Dessau.

== Early life ==
Frederick was born at Ratiboritz Castle, Bohemia (now Ratibořice Castle, Czech Republic), the third child and second son of Prince William of Schaumburg-Lippe (1834–1906), (son of George William, Prince of Schaumburg-Lippe and Princess Ida of Waldeck and Pyrmont) and his wife, Princess Bathildis of Anhalt-Dessau (1837–1902), (daughter of Prince Frederick Augustus of Anhalt-Dessau and Princess Marie Luise Charlotte of Hesse-Kassel).

== Marriages and issue ==
=== First marriage ===
Frederick married first on 5 May 1896 at Amalienborg Palace in Copenhagen to Princess Louise of Denmark, daughter of Crown Prince Frederick of Denmark, and his wife, Princess Louise of Sweden.

The marriage was an unhappy one and Princess Louise spent much time visiting her family, staying for 2 to 3 months at a time. Her father also came and visited with her each year.

Princess Louise died at Ratiboritz Castle on 4 April 1906. The official cause of death of Princess Louise was "cerebral inflammation" caused by meningitis, after weeks of being ill. It is rumoured she attempted to drown herself in the castle lake on her husband's estate, Ratiboritz, and caught a chill in the attempt, eventually leading to her death. Frederick and Louise had three children:

- Princess Marie Luise Dagmar Bathildis Charlotte of Schaumburg-Lippe (10 February 1897 – 1 October 1938) She married Prince Friedrich Sigismund of Prussia and had issue. Prince Friedrich died in a riding accident after a fall from his horse.
- Prince Christian Nikolaus Wilhelm Friedrich Albert Ernst of Schaumburg-Lippe (20 February 1898 – 13 July 1974) He married his first cousin, Princess Feodora of Denmark and had issue.
- Princess Stephanie Alexandra Hermine Thyra Xenia Bathildis Ingeborg of Schaumburg-Lippe (19 December 1899 – 2 May 1925). She married Viktor Adolf, 5th Prince of Bentheim und Steinfurt (son of Alexis, Prince of Bentheim and Steinfurt and Princess Pauline of Waldeck and Pyrmont) and had two sons: Prince Alexis (30 July 1922 – 2 December 1943, KIA over the Mediterranean), and Prince Christian (9 December 1923 - 12 December 2023). Stephanie died in childbirth with twin boys. Both boys died on 2 May 1925, one stillborn, the other living only a few hours.

=== Second marriage ===
Frederick married a second time on 26 May 1909 at Dessau to Princess Antoinette of Anhalt, daughter of Leopold, Hereditary Prince of Anhalt and his wife, Princess Elisabeth of Hesse-Kassel. Frederick and Antoinette had two sons:

- Prince Leopold Friedrich Alexander Wilhelm Eduard of Schaumburg-Lippe (21 February 1910 - 25 January 2006), unmarried and without issue.
- Prince Wilhelm Friedrich Karl Adolf Leopold Hilderich of Schaumburg-Lippe (24 August 1912 - 4 March 1938), unmarried and without issue.

== Honours ==
- Duchy of Anhalt: Grand Cross of the House Order of Albert the Bear, 1884
- Kingdom of Prussia: Knight of the Order of the Red Eagle, 1st Class, 22 November 1890
- Denmark:
  - Grand Cross of the Order of the Dannebrog, 26 May 1892
  - Commemorative Medal for the Golden Wedding of King Christian IX and Queen Louise, 1892
  - Cross of Honour of the Order of the Dannebrog, 6 May 1896
  - Knight of the Order of the Elephant, 14 September 1900
- Baden: Knight of the House Order of Fidelity, 1909

== Ancestry ==
Ancestors of Prince Frederick of Schaumburg-Lippe

8. Philip II Ernest, Count of Schaumburg-Lippe
4. George William, Prince of Schaumburg-Lippe
9. Landgravine Juliane of Hesse-Philippsthal
2. Prince William of Schaumburg-Lippe
10. George I, Prince of Waldeck and Pyrmont
5. Princess Ida of Waldeck and Pyrmont
11. Princess Auguste of Schwarzburg-Sondershausen
1. Prince Frederick of Schaumburg-Lippe
12. Frederick, Hereditary Prince of Anhalt-Dessau
6. Prince Frederick Augustus of Anhalt-Dessau
13. Landgravine Amalie of Hesse-Homburg
3. Princess Bathildis of Anhalt-Dessau
14. Prince William of Hesse-Kassel
7. Princess Marie Luise Charlotte of Hesse-Kassel
15. Princess Louise Charlotte of Denmark
