= Česká Skalice =

Town in the Czech Republic

- Town
- Old town hall

- Flag Coat of arms

- Location in the Czech Republic
- Coordinates: 50°23′38″N 16°2′55″E
- Country: Czech Republic
- Region: Hradec Králové
- District: Náchod
- First mentioned: 1238

Government
  - Mayor: Zuzana Jungwirthová

Area
  - Total: 17.36 km^{2} (6.70 sq mi)
- Elevation: 284 m (932 ft)

Population (2026-01-01)
  - Total: 4,970
  - Density: 286/km^{2} (741/sq mi)
- Time zone: UTC+1 (CET)
  - Summer (DST): UTC+2 (CEST)
- Postal code: 552 03
- Website: www.ceskaskalice.cz

Česká Skalice (Czech pronunciation: [ˈtʃɛskaː ˈskalɪtsɛ]; German: Böhmisch Skalitz) is a town in Náchod District in the Hradec Králové Region of the Czech Republic. It has about 5,000 inhabitants. The town is located on the Úpa River and on the shore of Rozkoš Reservoir.

Česká Skalice is known for the Ratibořice Castle and Grandmother's Valley, both associated with the work of one of the most important Czech women writers, Božena Němcová.

== Administrative division ==
Česká Skalice consists of six municipal parts (in brackets population according to the 2021 census):

- Česká Skalice (3,454)
- Malá Skalice (993)
- Ratibořice (9)
- Spyta (75)
- Zájezd (203)
- Zlíč (198)

== Etymology ==
The name Skalice is a diminutive of the Czech word skála, i.e. 'rock'. The settlement was initially named Velká Skalice ('great Skalice') and later renamed Česká Skalice ('Czech/Bohemian Skalice')

== Geography ==
Česká Skalice is located about 8 kilometres (5 mi) west of Náchod and 24 km (15 mi) northeast of Hradec Králové. It lies in the Orlice Table. The town is situated on the Úpa River. The Grandmother's Valley (Czech: Babiččino údolí) along the river is protected as a national nature monument. Part of Rozkoš Reservoir, on whose shores the town is located, lies in the municipal territory.

== History ==
In Chronica Boemorum is mentioned a trade route from Bohemia to Poland through this area in the 11th century. In the early 13th century, two settlement with fortresses were founded near this route and named Malá Skalice and Velká Skalice. In 1490, they are first referred to as one village named Česká Skalice. In 1504, Česká Skalice was promoted to a market town and in 1575, it was promoted to a town.

In the 19th century, the town was industrialised and textile factories were established.

== Demographics ==
Historical population

Year	Pop.	±%
1869	3,507	—
1880	4,008	+14.3%
1890	3,949	−1.5%
1900	4,249	+7.6%
1910	5,084	+19.7%

Year	Pop.	±%
1921	4,374	−14.0%
1930	4,554	+4.1%
1950	4,152	−8.8%
1961	4,418	+6.4%
1970	4,497	+1.8%

Year	Pop.	±%
1980	5,039	+12.1%
1991	5,594	+11.0%
2001	5,407	−3.3%
2011	5,171	−4.4%
2021	4,932	−4.6%

Source: Censuses

== Transport ==
The I/33 road from Hradec Králové to Náchod (part of the European route E67) runs next to the town.

Česká Skalice is located on the railway lines–Prague–Trutnov and Pardubice–Svoboda nad Úpou.

== Sights ==
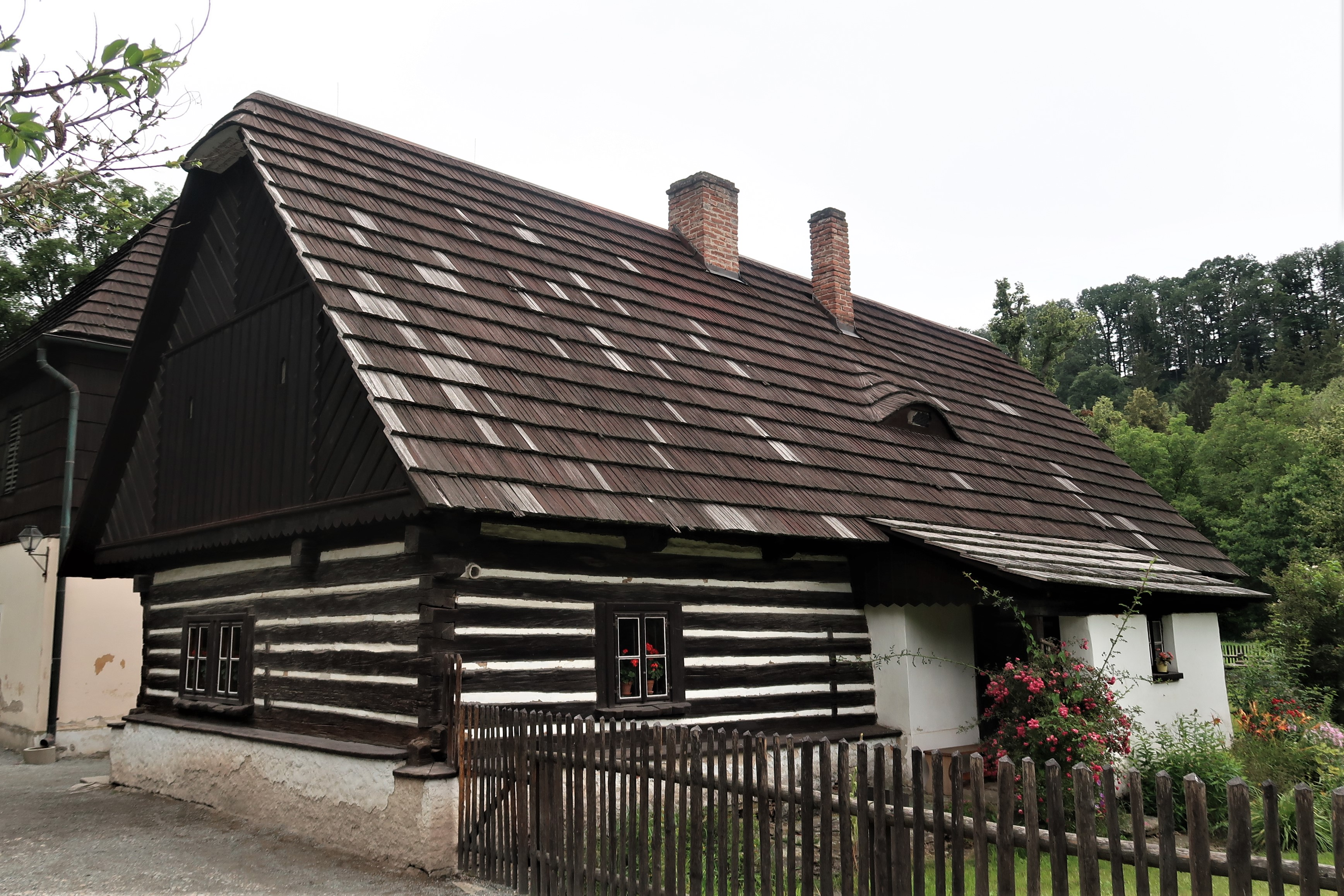
Staré bělidlo house

The Ratibořice Castle and Grandmother's Valley is the most popular tourist destination. It is visited for its connection with life and work of Božena Němcová, who belongs among the most impactful Czech writers. The castle was built in the Baroque style and rebuilt in the Neoclassical style. Next to the castle is a castle park. Part of the landscape with a direct link to Němcová's literature is also a remote mill and Staré bělidlo, a romantic wooden log cabin. The area of the castle and valley is protected as a national cultural monument.

Among the landmarks of Česká Skalice is the Church of the Assumption of the Virgin Mary, located in Malá Skalice. It is a Baroque building from the 18th century.

In Malá Skalice is Božena Němcová Museum, opened in 1931. In addition to an exhibition about the life and work of this writer, it also includes a collection of paintings by Julie Winterová-Mezerová donated by the artist. Until 2017, there was Textile Museum as well, but it was closed and the exposition was moved to nearby Dvůr Králové nad Labem.

== Notable people ==
- František Rint, 19th-century woodcarver
- Božena Němcová (1820–1862), writer; lived here
- Charlotte of Schaumburg-Lippe (1864–1946), German princess
- Frederick of Schaumburg-Lippe (1868–1945), German prince
- Bathildis of Schaumburg-Lippe (1873–1962), German princess
- Adelaide of Schaumburg-Lippe (1875–1971), German princess

== Twin towns – sister cities ==
Česká Skalice is twinned with:

- Bardo, Poland
- Kudowa-Zdrój, Poland
- Liptovský Hrádok, Slovakia
- Polanica-Zdrój, Poland
- Rüschlikon, Switzerland
- Vojnik, Slovenia
- Warrington, England, United Kingdom
