= Charlotte of Schaumburg-Lippe =

Queen of Württemberg from 1891 to 1918

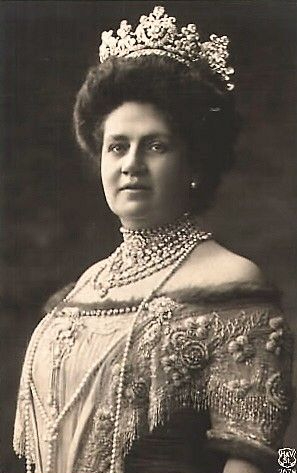
- Photograph, c. 1909–1918

Queen consort of Württemberg
- Tenure: 6 October 1891 – 30 November 1918
- Born: 10 September 1864; Schloss Ratiborschitz, Bohemia
- Died: 16 July 1946 (aged 81); Bebenhausen
- Spouse: William II of Württemberg (m. 1886; died 1921)
- House: Lippe
- Father: Prince William of Schaumburg-Lippe
- Mother: Princess Bathildis of Anhalt-Dessau
- Religion: Calvinism

Princess Charlotte of Schaumburg-Lippe (10 October 1864 – 16 July 1946) was Queen of Württemberg from 6 October 1891 to 30 November 1918 as the second wife and consort of King William II. Charlotte was not only the last queen of Württemberg, but the last surviving queen of any German state.

== Biography ==
=== Early life ===
Charlotte was born in Schloss Ratiborschitz, Bohemia (now Ratibořice, Česká Skalice, Czech Republic), as a member of the Schaumburg-Lippe branch of an old House of Lippe. She was the daughter of Prince William of Schaumburg-Lippe and his wife, Princess Bathildis of Anhalt-Dessau. Charlotte grew up with her siblings on the princely estate at Náchod. In addition to general cultural interests such as music and art, she was also very keen on sporting pursuits, including swimming, tennis, cycling, and — unusual for a woman of the time — skiing. She also had an extraordinary passion for hunting.

=== Marriage ===
On 8 April 1886 she married the heir to the throne of the Kingdom of Württemberg, Crown Prince Wilhelm, who succeeded in 1891 as King William II of Württemberg (Wilhelm II. von Württemberg). She was his second wife, and like her cousin and predecessor Princess Marie of Waldeck and Pyrmont was held to be of no political consequence. If the marriage had taken place for reasons of state - Wilhelm had no male heir - it was a miscalculation, as Charlotte produced no children.

As a princess of Württemberg she lived initially in Ludwigsburg and Stuttgart, but as queen in the Wilhelmspalais in Stuttgart. From June to October the royal couple moved to their residence at Friedrichshafen. Finally in November/December Wilhelm and Charlotte regularly took a two-week hunting holiday in Schloss Bebenhausen (the former Bebenhausen Abbey) at Bebenhausen near Tübingen, which after the revolution of 1918 became Charlotte's permanent home.

In 1890, William brought his new wife to England, where the Princess May of Teck commented, "We liked Charlotte very much, she is a good honest soul tho' rather too brusque, she seems to get on well with all the members of the Württemberg family which denotes great tact".

=== Queen of Württemberg ===
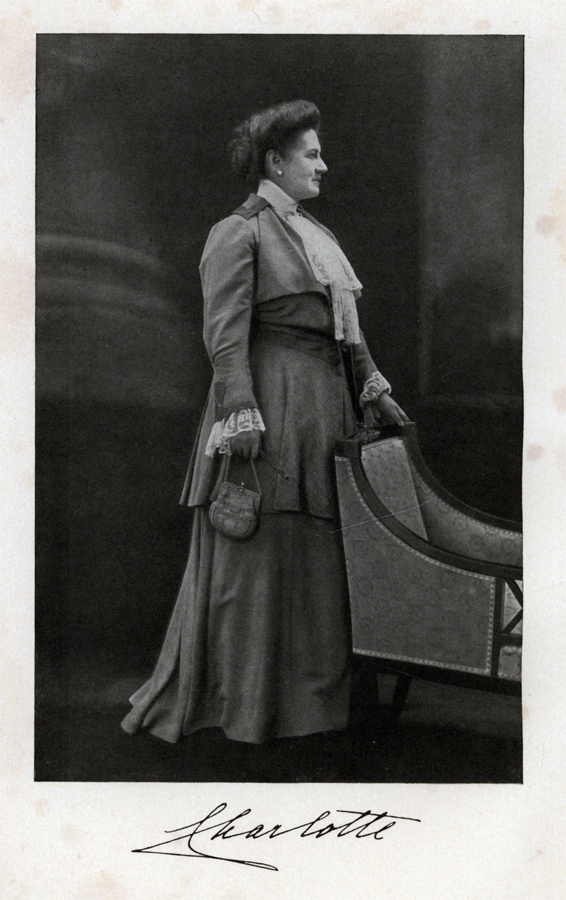
Queen Charlotte in 1916

King Wilhelm II enjoyed great popularity among his contemporaries, but Queen Charlotte's relationship with the people of Württemberg was by contrast very reserved, as appears from publications of the time in which a distinct enthusiasm towards the king is matched by an equally apparent coolness towards the queen. Her childlessness doubtless contributed to this, but by itself is not a sufficient explanation.

The principal reason appears to lie in Charlotte's perceived reluctance to carry out her public and ceremonial duties as it was felt she should have done. For example, she preferred to celebrate her birthdays in the privacy of Friedrichshafen rather than in visible togetherness with her subjects. She left the king mostly on his own to oversee military parades, and after a few years no longer accompanied him in the public celebration of the Kaiser's birthday. She was also not thought regal enough for her new position; the Grand Duchess of Mecklenburg-Strelitz commented in 1892, "I heard ...that she is too jolly & off-hand for a Queen, and so ugly besides". The Grand Duchess' sister the Duchess of Teck liked Charlotte, but believed she took no trouble with her clothes or appearance. This contrasted sharply with her husband, who was known as a cultivated and distinguished man of aesthetic tastes.

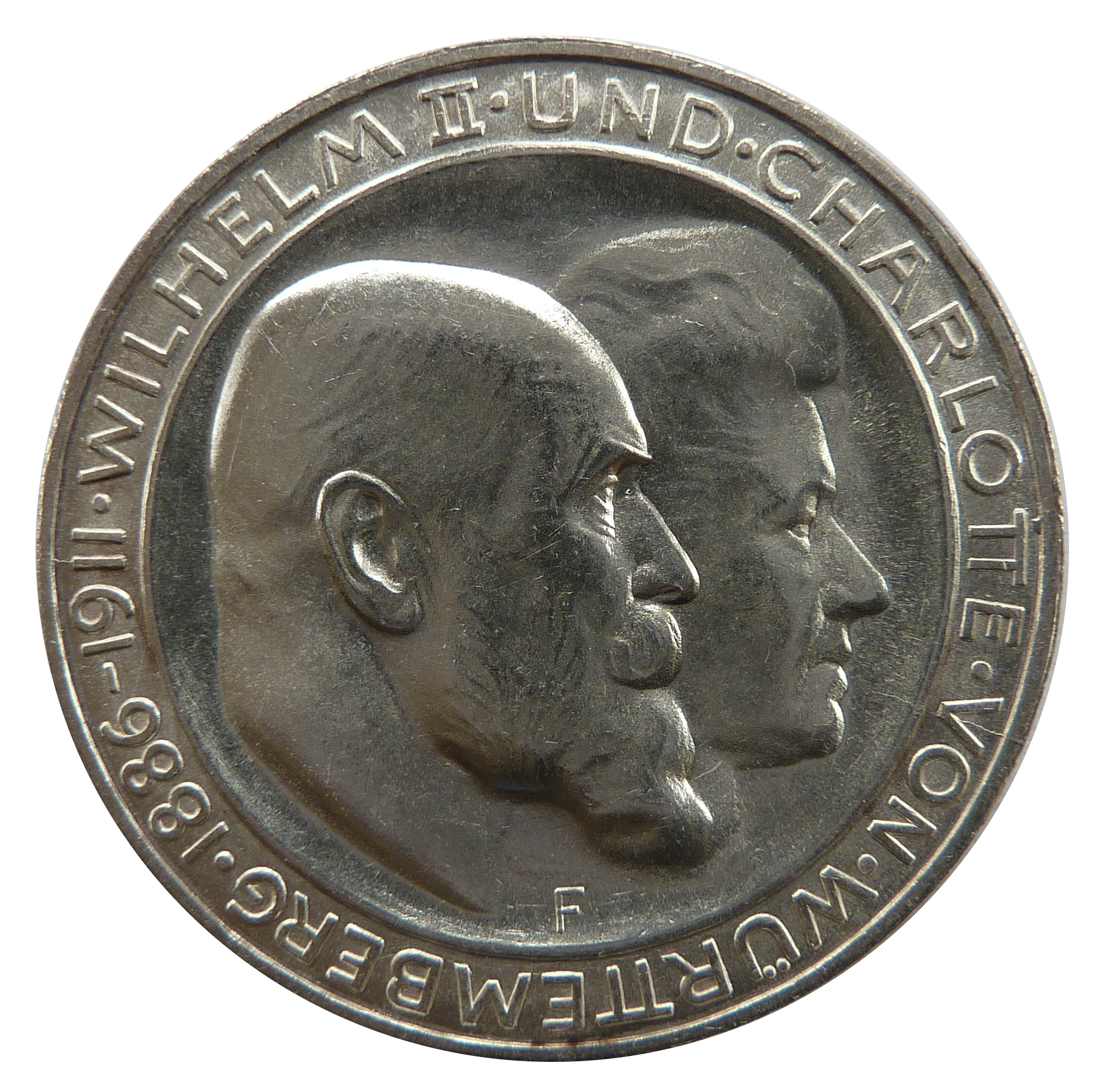
3 Mark coin of Württemberg commemorating the silver anniversary of Charlotte and Wilhelm.

Charlotte nevertheless displayed an interest in and openness towards some social causes, mostly to do with the benefit of women. As convention demanded, she took over from her predecessor the patronage of a large number of social and charitable organisations, among them the body of deaconesses (Diakonissenwesen), the Swabian Women's Union (Schwäbische Frauenverein), the Württemberg Savings Bank (Württembergische Sparkasse) and the Red Cross. Among these her interest was most noticeably engaged by those to do in some way with women's causes. She was not of course personally involved in the women's movement as such, but did demonstrate a willingness to further institutions that in various ways improved the lot and social position of women, lending her royal authority above all to support establishments that provided education and training to enable girls to be independent and to provide for themselves through their work. She showed a particular involvement as patron of the Württemberg Union of Women Painters (Württembergische Malerinnenverein) and the first humanistic Gymnasium for girls in Württemberg, the Charlottengymnasium in Stuttgart (today the Hölderlingymnasium).

Her support of the Malerinnenverein connects to her interest in art and culture. Together with her husband she was active in the country's cultural life and often went to the theatre and the opera.

After the November Revolution of 1918 and the abolition of the monarchy, Wilhelm II agreed with the State of Württemberg for himself and his wife an annual income and right of residence for life in Schloss Bebenhausen, where after Wilhelm's death in 1921, Charlotte led a secluded life, under the title of Duchess of Württemberg (Herzogin zu Württemberg), for another quarter of a century. In 1944 she suffered a stroke which forced her for the last years of her life to use a wheelchair.

== Death ==
Queen Charlotte died at Bebenhausen on 16 July 1946 aged 82. She was not only the last Queen of Württemberg but the last surviving queen of any German state: the last King of Saxony was divorced at the time of his abdication, the Queen of Bavaria had died in 1919, and the Queen of Prussia in 1921. She was buried, almost unnoticed, on 23 July 1946, in the Alter Friedhof in Ludwigsburg next to her husband.

== Ancestry ==
Ancestors of Charlotte of Schaumburg-Lippe

8. Philip II Ernest, Count of Schaumburg-Lippe
4. George William, Prince of Schaumburg-Lippe
9. Landgravine Juliane of Hesse-Philippsthal
2. Prince William of Schaumburg-Lippe
10. George I, Prince of Waldeck and Pyrmont
5. Princess Ida of Waldeck and Pyrmont
11. Princess Auguste of Schwarzburg-Sondershausen
1. Charlotte of Schaumburg-Lippe
12. Frederick, Hereditary Prince of Anhalt-Dessau
6. Prince Frederick Augustus of Anhalt-Dessau
13. Landgravine Amalie of Hesse-Homburg
3. Princess Bathildis of Anhalt-Dessau
14. Prince William of Hesse-Kassel
7. Princess Marie Luise Charlotte of Hesse-Kassel
15. Princess Louise Charlotte of Denmark

== Sources ==
- Lorenz, Mertens, Press (eds.), 1997: Das Haus Württemberg. Ein biographisches Lexikon, p. 335. Stuttgart; Kohlhammer Verlag ISBN 3-17-013605-4
- Decker-Hauff, H, 1997: Frauen im Hause Württemberg, p. 276. DRW-Verlag: Leinfelden-Echterdingen ISBN 3-87181-390-7
- Pope-Hennessy, James (1959). Queen Mary 1867-1953. London: George Allen and Unwin Unlimited. ISBN 0-04-923025-5.
- Thomsen, S., 2006: Die württembergischen Königinnen: Charlotte Mathilde, Katharina, Pauline, Olga, Charlotte - ihr Leben und Wirken. Tübingen

Charlotte of Schaumburg-Lippe House of Lippe Born: 10 October 1864 Died: 16 July 1946
German royalty
| Preceded by Olga Nikolaevna of Russia | Queen consort of Württemberg; 1891–1918 | Monarchy abolished German Revolution |
Titles in pretence
| Loss of title Republic declared | — TITULAR — Queen consort of Württemberg; 1918–1921 | Vacant Title next held by Archduchess Rosa of Austria |
