= Princess Feodora of Denmark =

Danish princess (1910–1975)

- Princess Christian of Schaumburg-Lippe
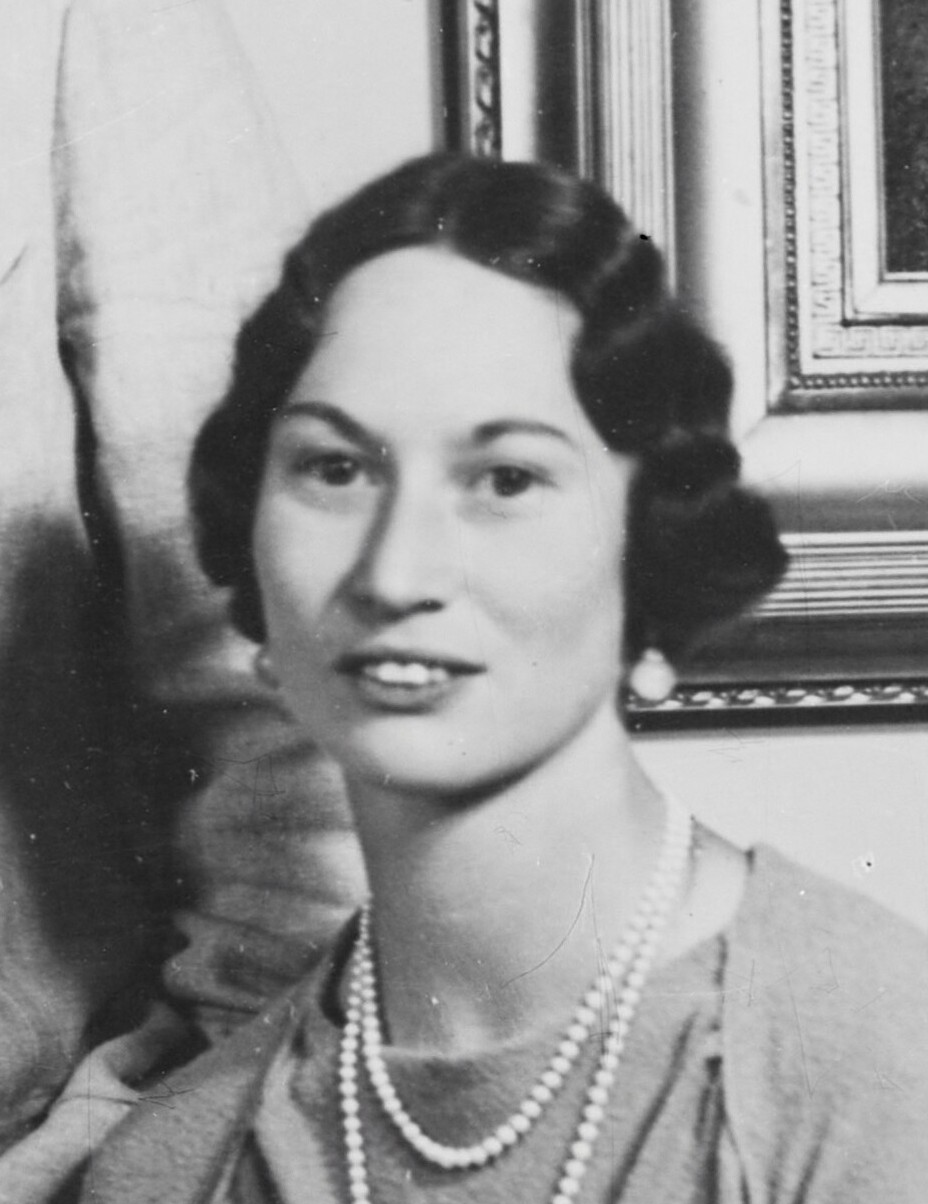
- Princess Feodora in 1937
- Born: 3 July 1910; Jægersborghus Mansion, Gentofte, Denmark
- Died: 17 March 1975 (aged 64); Bückeburg, Lower Saxony, West Germany
- Spouse: Prince Christian of Schaumburg-Lippe (m. 1937; died 1974)
- Issue: Prince Wilhelm; Prince Waldemar; Princess Marie-Louise; Prince Harald
Names
- Feodora Louise Caroline-Mathilde Viktoria Alexandra Frederikke Johanne
- House: Glücksburg
- Father: Prince Harald of Denmark
- Mother: Princess Helena Adelaide of Schleswig-Holstein-Sonderburg-Glücksburg

Princess Feodora of Denmark (Feodora Louise Caroline-Mathilde Viktoria Alexandra Frederikke Johanne; 3 July 1910 – 17 March 1975) was a Danish princess as the daughter of Prince Harald of Denmark and granddaughter of Frederick VIII of Denmark. As the wife of Prince Christian of Schaumburg-Lippe, she became a Princess of Schaumburg-Lippe by marriage.

== Early life ==
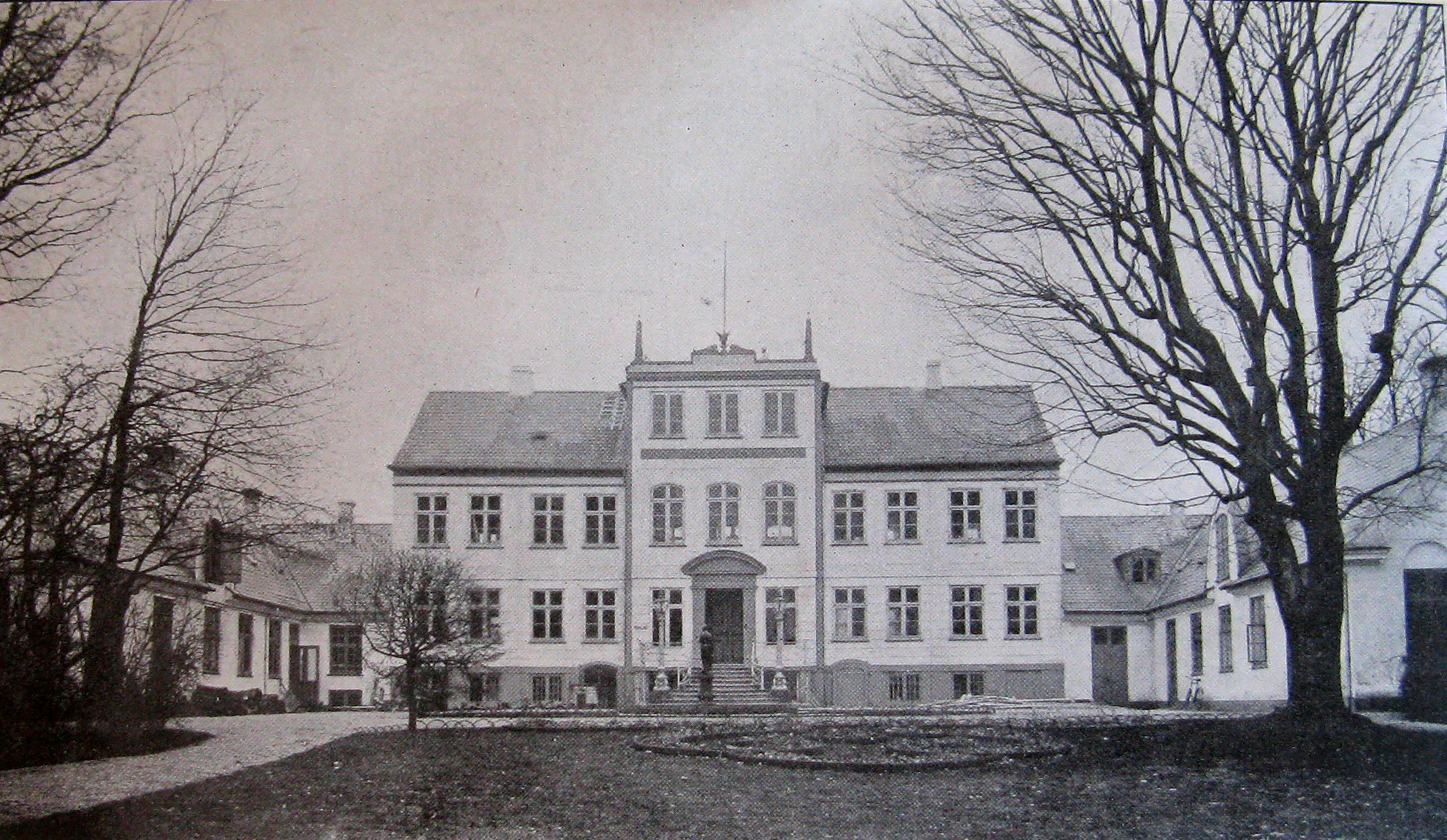
Princess Feodora's birthplace Jægersborghus in 1909

Princess Feodora was born on 3 July 1910 at the Jægersborghus country house in Gentofte north of Copenhagen, Denmark. She was the eldest child of Prince Harald of Denmark, son of King Frederik VIII and Princess Louise of Sweden. Her mother was Princess Helena of Schleswig-Holstein-Sonderburg-Glücksburg, daughter of Friedrich Ferdinand, Duke of Schleswig-Holstein.

== Marriage and issue ==
Feodora married her first cousin, Prince Christian of Schaumburg-Lippe, on 9 September 1937 at Fredensborg Palace, Zealand, Denmark. Prince Christian was a son of Prince Frederick of Schaumburg-Lippe and Princess Louise of Denmark, a sister of Feodora's father.

Feodora and Christian had four children:

- Prince Wilhelm of Schaumburg-Lippe (19 August 1939 – 9 July 2026); married in 1970 Ilona Freiin Hentschel von Gilgenheimb (1940–2023).
- Prince Waldemar of Schaumburg-Lippe (19 December 1940 – 11 August 2020).
- Princess Marie-Louise of Schaumburg-Lippe (27 December 1945 – 2 September 2025).
- Prince Harald of Schaumburg-Lippe (b. 27 March 1948).

== Later life ==
Prince Christian died in 1974. Princess Feodora died on 17 March the following year in Bückeburg, Lower Saxony, West Germany.

== Ancestry ==
Ancestors of Princess Feodora of Denmark

8. Christian IX of Denmark
4. Frederik VIII of Denmark
9. Princess Louise of Hesse-Kassel
2. Prince Harald of Denmark
10. Charles XV of Sweden
5. Princess Louise of Sweden
11. Princess Louise of the Netherlands
1. Princess Feodora of Denmark
12. Friedrich, Duke of Schleswig-Holstein-Sonderburg-Glücksburg
6. Friedrich Ferdinand, Duke of Schleswig-Holstein
13. Princess Adelheid of Schaumburg-Lippe
3. Princess Helena of Schleswig-Holstein-Sonderburg-Glücksburg
14. Frederick VIII, Duke of Schleswig-Holstein
7. Princess Karoline Mathilde of Schleswig-Holstein-Sonderburg-Augustenburg
15. Princess Adelheid of Hohenlohe-Langenburg
