= Prince Waldemar of Schaumburg-Lippe =

German prince (1940–2020)

Prince Waldemar
- Born: 19 December 1940; Berlin, Prussia, Germany
- Died: 11 August 2020 (aged 79); United States
- Spouse: Anne-Lise Johansen (m. 1977; div. 1991) Karin Grundmann (m. 2001; div. 2002) Ruth Schneidewind (m. 2002; div. 2003) Gertraud Antonia Schöppl (m. 2008)
- Issue: Princess Eleonore
- House: Lippe
- Father: Prince Christian of Schaumburg-Lippe
- Mother: Princess Feodora of Denmark

Prince Waldemar of Schaumburg-Lippe (German: Waldemar Stephan Ferdinand Wolrad Friedrich Karl Prinz zu Schaumburg-Lippe; 19 December 1940 – 11 August 2020) was a German-born banker and member of the House of Schaumburg-Lippe. He was the second son of Princess Feodora of Denmark and Prince Christian of Schaumburg-Lippe as well as a twice great-grandson of Frederik VIII of Denmark; as such, he was a second cousin twice over of Margrethe II of Denmark.

== Life ==
Prince Waldemar was born in Germany in 1940. Queen Alexandrine of Denmark was among his godparents. At the age of five, he moved to Denmark to live with his maternal aunt and uncle, Princess Caroline-Mathilde and Prince Knud. At the age of 10, he returned to West Germany. He later trained as a banker.

In 1977, he moved to Denmark once again and became a Danish citizen upon marrying Anne-Lise Johansen, the court photographer of his second cousin twice over, Margrethe II.

Prince Waldemar died on 11 August 2020 in the United States at the age of 79.

== Marriage and issue ==
Prince Waldemar first married Anne-Lise Johansen (Copenhagen, 8 August 1946 – Dronningmølle, 27 July 1994) in Karlebo on 10 September 1977. They divorced in 1991. They had one daughter:

- Princess Eleonore-Christine Eugenie Benita Feodora Maria of Schaumburg-Lippe (born 22 December 1978 in Hørsholm, Denmark)

He married secondly Karin Grundmann (9 December 1962) in Hamburg on 15 May 2001. They divorced in 2002. They had no children.

He married thirdly Ruth Schneidewind (4 August 1949) in Wilhelmshaven, Lower Saxony, in 2002. They divorced in 2003. They had no children.

Prince Waldemar married fourthly Gertraud Antonia Schöppl (21 September 1956) on 20 September 2008 at Schönbrunn Palace, Vienna. He adopted her son:

- Dr. Mario-Max Prinz zu Schaumburg-Lippe (born December 23, 1977) in Salzburg, Austria.

== Notes ==
=== Bibliography ===
- Bramsen, Bo (1992). Huset Glücksborg. Europas svigerfader og hans efterslægt [The House of Glücksburg. The Father-in-law of Europe and his descendants] (in Danish) (2nd ed.). Copenhagen: Forlaget Forum. ISBN 87-553-1843-6.
