= The Grandmother (novella) =

Story by the Czech author Božena Němcová

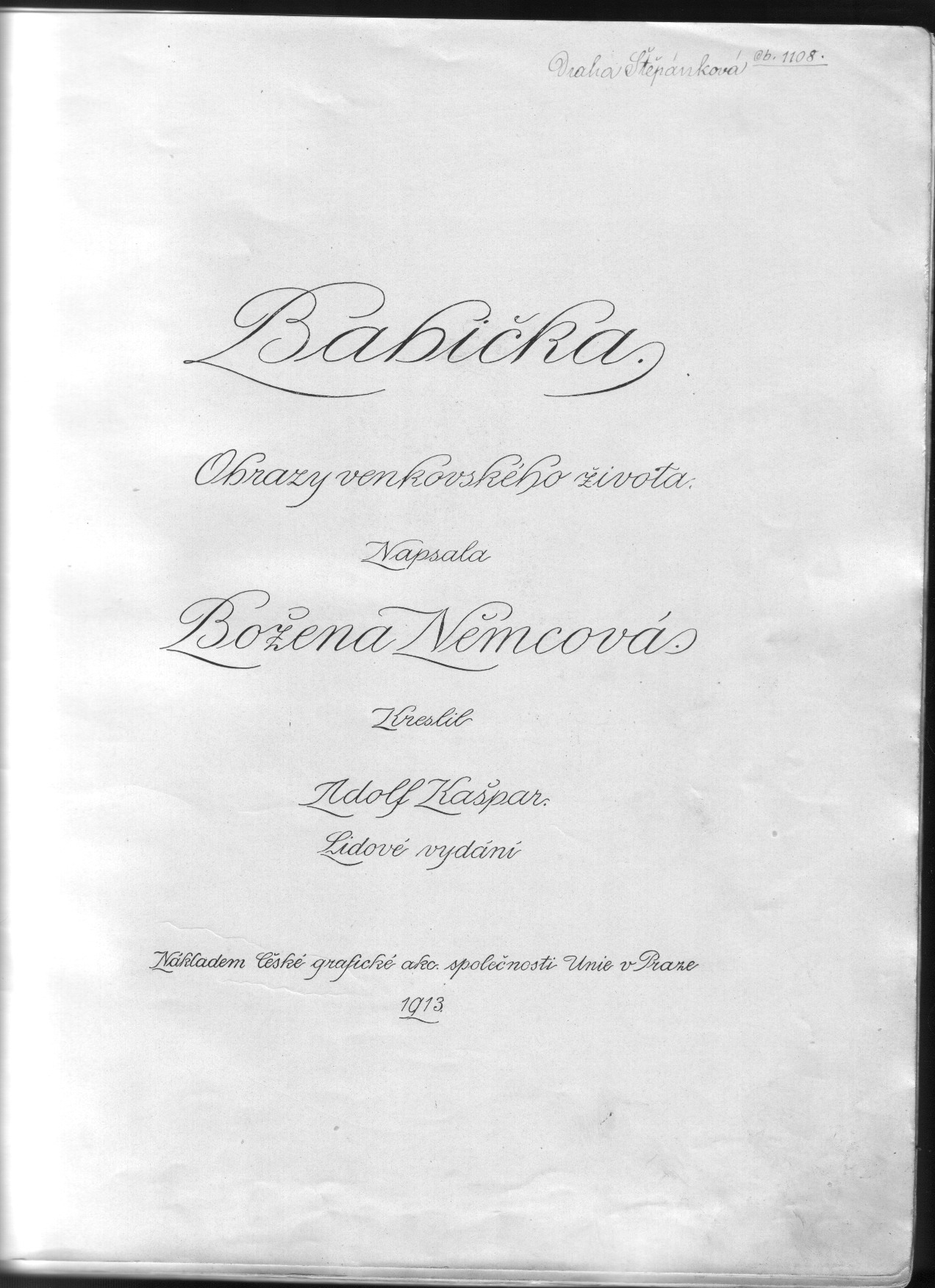
- The title page of Babička from 1913.
- Author: Božena Němcová
- Original title: Babička
- Genre: Novella

The Grandmother (Czech: Babička) is a novella written by Czech writer Božena Němcová in 1853–1854 and first published in 1855. It is her most popular work and is regarded as a classic piece of Czech literature. This most frequently read book of the Czech nation was published more than 300 times in Czech alone and translated into 21 other languages.

== Plot ==
The book describes, in an idealized form, the childhood of Němcová. The plot weaves together a remembrance of the agrarian calendar and customs of the neighborhood with the love stories of several women, which reveal more of the history and customs of that area. The main action of the novel seems to take place during the first one or two years after the Grandmother has come to live at the Old Bleachery with her daughter's family, to help manage the household. The father is frequently absent due to his job as equerry to the local noblewoman, which takes him away to Vienna during the winter. The principal action of the story is to tell the intertwining tales of Viktorka, Kristla, and the Countess. The author is identified with Barunka, the eldest daughter of the Prošek family; however, the novel is not told from her point of view.

== See also ==
- Ratibořice
