= Princess Louise of Denmark (1875–1906) =

Danish princess

Princess Louise
- Princess Friedrich of Schaumburg-Lippe
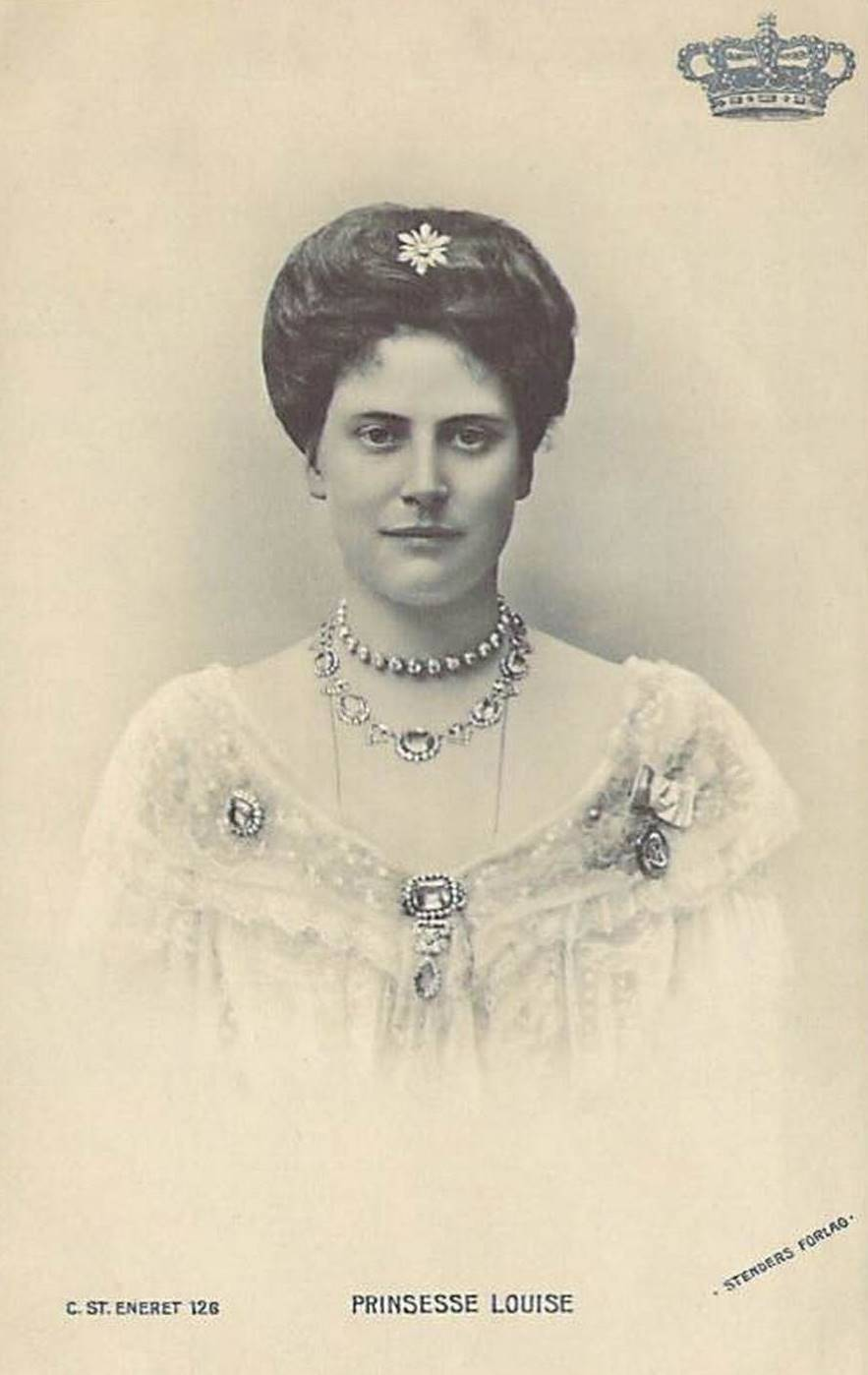
- Photograph, c. 1895
- Born: 17 February 1875; Amalienborg Palace, Copenhagen, Denmark
- Died: 4 April 1906 (aged 31); Ratiboritz Castle, Bohemia, Austria-Hungary
- Spouse: Prince Friedrich of Schaumburg-Lippe (m. 1896)
- Issue: Marie Louise, Princess Friedrich Sigismund of Prussia; Prince Christian; Stephanie, Princess of Bentheim and Steinfurt
Names
- Louise Caroline Josephine Sophie Thyra Olga
- House: Glücksburg
- Father: Frederick VIII of Denmark
- Mother: Louise of Sweden

Princess Louise of Denmark (Louise Caroline Josephine Sophie Thyra Olga) (17 February 1875 – 4 April 1906) was a member of the Danish royal family who became a princess of Schaumburg-Lippe by marriage.

The third child and oldest daughter of King Frederik VIII and his wife, Queen Louise, Princess Louise grew up in Copenhagen as a Danish princess. Known for her shy and quiet personality, Louise remained a low-key member of the royal family throughout her life. In 1896, she married her second cousin Prince Friedrich of Schaumburg-Lippe who belonged to a cadet branch of the German princely house of Schaumburg-Lippe and was heir to the lordship of Náchod in Bohemia. After the wedding, she moved with him to Bohemia where she died in 1906, aged 31.

== Early life ==
Princess Louise was born on 17 February 1875 in Frederik VIII's Palace, an 18th-century palace which forms part of the Amalienborg Palace complex in central Copenhagen, during the reign of her paternal grandfather, King Christian IX. She was the third child and first daughter of Crown Prince Frederick of Denmark and his wife Louise of Sweden. Her father was the eldest son of King Christian IX of Denmark and Louise of Hesse-Kassel, and her mother was the only daughter of King Charles XV of Sweden and Norway and Louise of the Netherlands. She was baptised with the names Louise Caroline Josephine Sophie Thyra Olga, and was known as Princess Louise (namesake of her mother, as well as her paternal and maternal grandmothers).

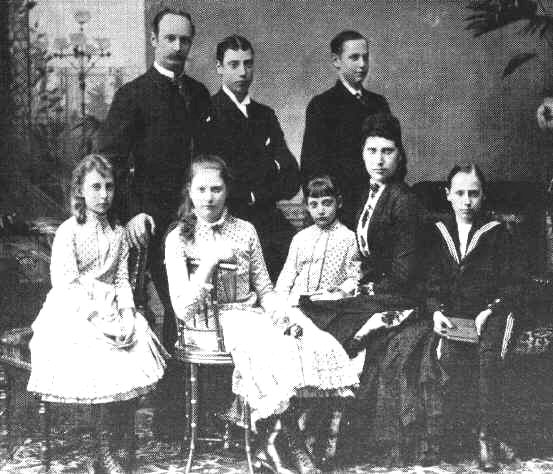
Crown Prince Frederik and Crown Princess Louise with their children in 1885.

Princess Louise was raised with her siblings in the royal household in Denmark and grew up between her parents' city residence in Copenhagen, the Frederik VIII's Palace at the Amalienborg Palace complex, and their country retreat, the Charlottenlund Palace, located by the coastline of the Øresund strait north of the city. In contrast to the usual practise of the period, where royal children were brought up by governesses, the children were raised by Crown Princess Louise herself. Under the supervision of their mother, the children of the Crown Princess received a rather strict Christian-dominated upbringing, which was characterized by austerity, the fulfilment of duties, care and order. Like her siblings, she was educated privately under the supervision of tutors. From childhood, Louise was described as a very withdrawn girl with a shy and quiet personality. As she also married and left Denmark at an early age, she remained a relatively unnoticed member of the Danish royal family throughout her life.

== Marriage ==
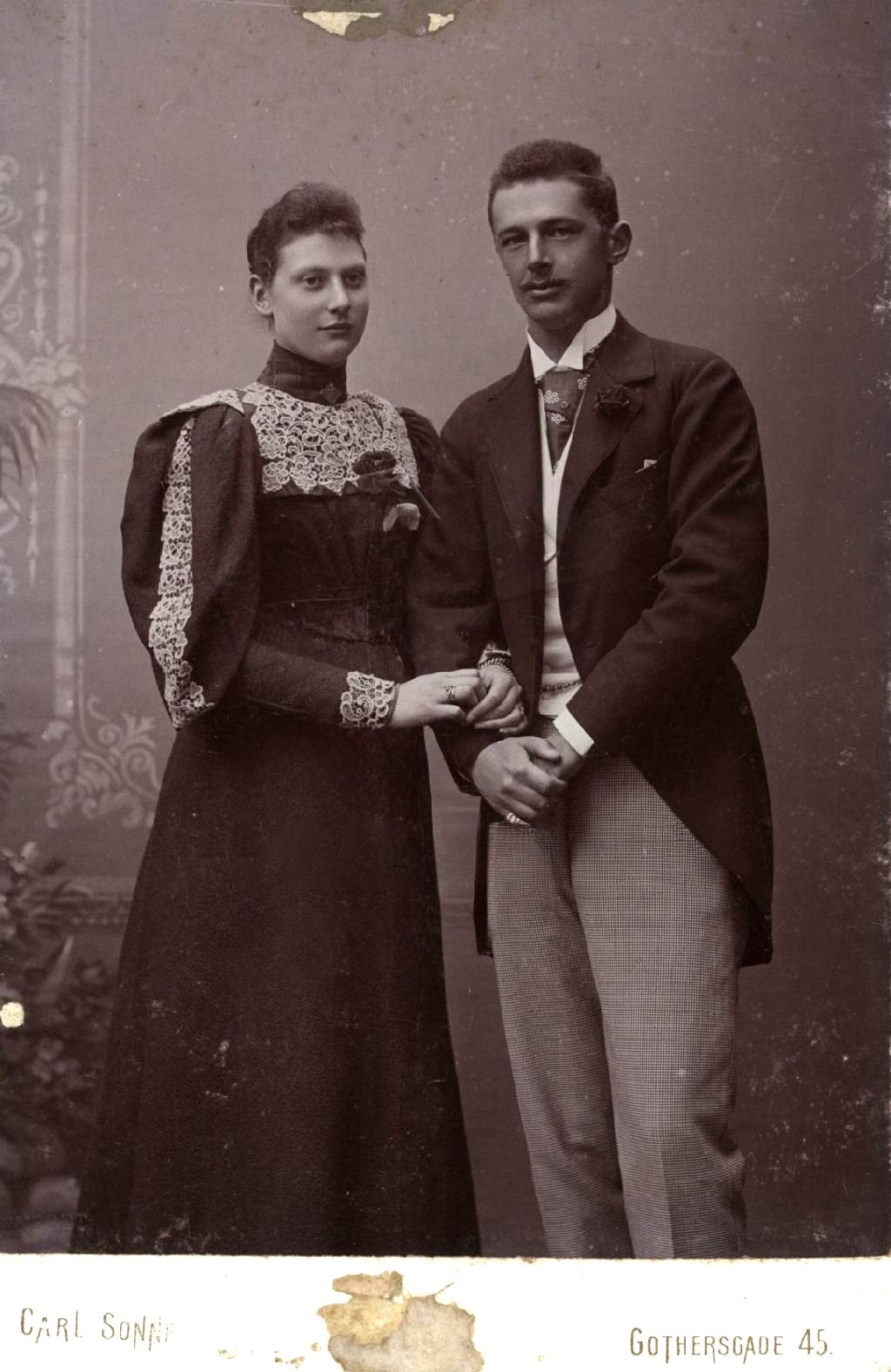
Princess Louise and Prince Frederick in 1896.

Princess Louise's grandmother, Queen Louise, was known for her successful matchmaking skills. She recognized early on that her granddaughter had a tendency towards melancholy and wanted her to marry well. Through her German relations, Queen Louise was in contact with a cadet branch of the German princely house of Schaumburg-Lippe, which possessed the castle and lordship of Náchod in northeastern Bohemia as a secundogeniture. Thus, Princess Louise was introduced to her half-cousin Prince Frederick of Schaumburg-Lippe (1868–1945). He was a son of Prince William of Schaumburg-Lippe by his wife, Princess Bathildis of Anhalt-Dessau. The couple were engaged in 1894, and the wedding was celebrated on 5 May 1896 at Amalienborg Palace in Copenhagen.

The couple lived in Ratiboritz Castle in Bohemia. They had three children. The marriage was not a happy one, however. Princess Louise suffered from melancholy and homesickness, longed for Denmark and spent much time visiting her family, staying for 2 to 3 months at a time. Her father also came and visited with her each year.

== Death ==
Princess Louise died at Ratiboritz Castle on 4 April 1906, within five hours of the death of her father-in-law Prince William, and 65 days after her paternal grandfather King Christian IX. The official cause of death of Princess Louise was "cerebral inflammation" caused by meningitis, after weeks of being ill. It was rumoured that she attempted to drown herself in the castle lake on her husband's estate, Ratiboritz, and caught a chill in the attempt, eventually leading to her death. She was the only child of Frederick VIII of Denmark and Louise of Sweden to have predeceased her parents.

== Issue ==
Frederick and Louise had three children:

- Princess Marie Luise Dagmar Bathildis Charlotte of Schaumburg-Lippe (10 February 1897 – 1 October 1938) She married Prince Friedrich Sigismund of Prussia and had issue. Prince Friedrich died in a riding accident after a fall from his horse.
- Prince Christian Nikolaus Wilhelm Friedrich Albert Ernst of Schaumburg-Lippe (20 February 1898 – 13 July 1974) He married his first cousin, Princess Feodora of Denmark, and had issue.
- Princess Stephanie Alexandra Hermine Thyra Xenia Bathildis Ingeborg of Schaumburg-Lippe (19 December 1899 – 2 May 1925). She married Viktor Adolf, Prince of Bentheim and Steinfurt (1883–1961) (son of Alexis, Prince of Bentheim and Steinfurt and Princess Pauline of Waldeck and Pyrmont) and had two sons; Prince Alexis (30 July 1922 – 2 December 1943, KIA over the Mediterranean) and Prince Christian (9 December 1923 – 12 December 2023). Stephanie died in childbirth with twin boys. Both boys died on 2 May 1925, one stillborn, the other living only a few hours.
