= Prince William of Schaumburg-Lippe =

Austrian general (1834–1906)

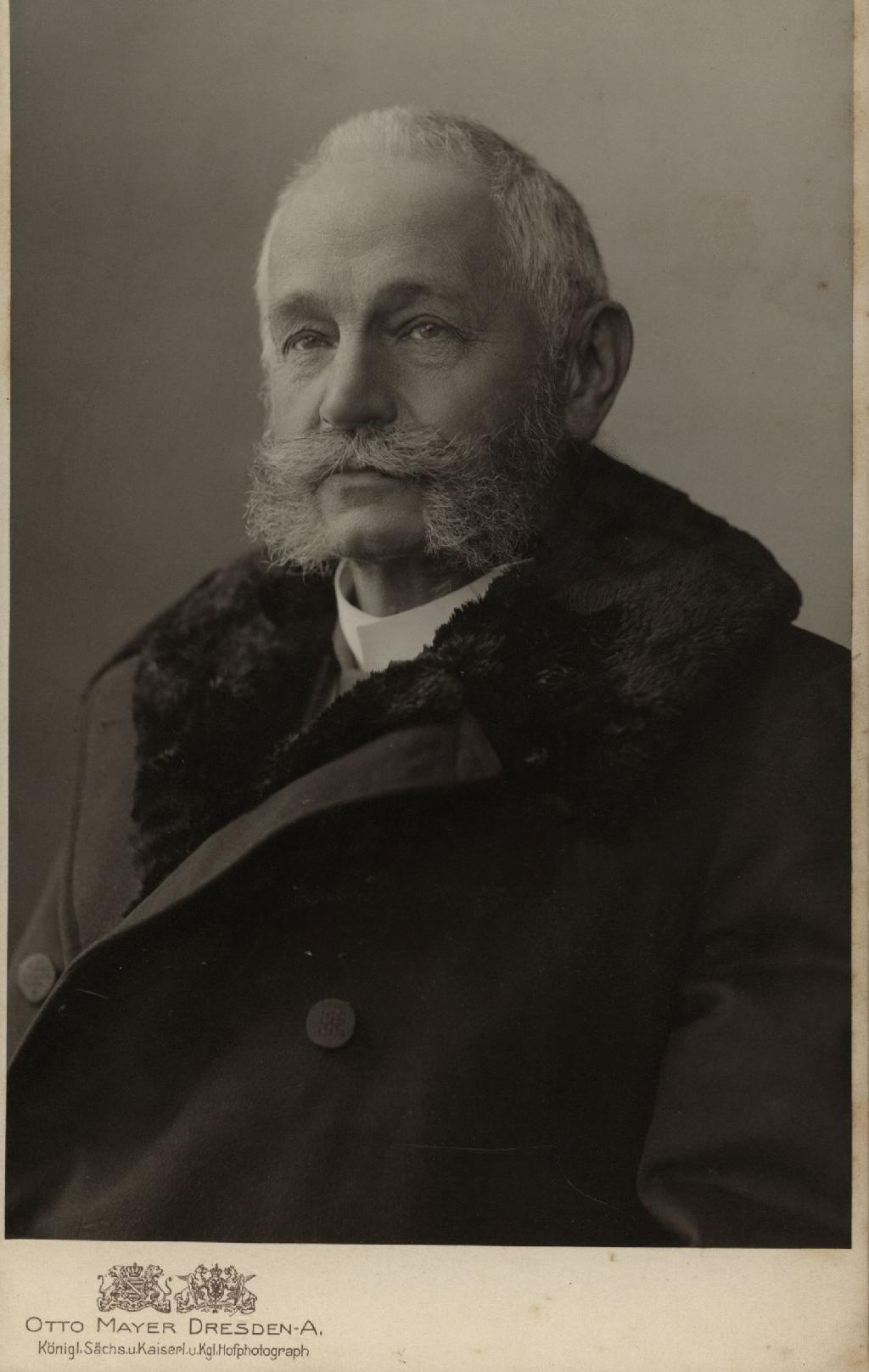
- Prince William c. 1900–06
- Born: 12 December 1834; Bückeburg, Schaumburg-Lippe, German Confederation
- Died: 4 April 1906 (aged 71); Ratibořice, Bohemia, Cisleithania, Austria-Hungary
- Spouse: Princess Bathildis of Anhalt-Dessau (m. 1862; died 1902)
- Issue: Charlotte, Queen of Württemberg; Prince Franz Joseph; Prince Friedrich; Prince Albrecht; Prince Maximilian; Bathildis, Princess of Waldeck and Pyrmont; Adelaide, Duchess of Saxe-Altenburg; Princess Alexandra
Names
- German: Wilhelm Karl August zu Schaumburg-Lippe
- House: House of Lippe
- Father: George William, Prince of Schaumburg-Lippe
- Mother: Princess Ida of Waldeck and Pyrmont

Prince William of Schaumburg-Lippe (German: Prinz Wilhelm Karl August zu Schaumburg-Lippe; 12 December 1834 – 4 April 1906) was the son of George William, Prince of Schaumburg-Lippe and member of the House of Lippe.

== Early life and ancestry ==
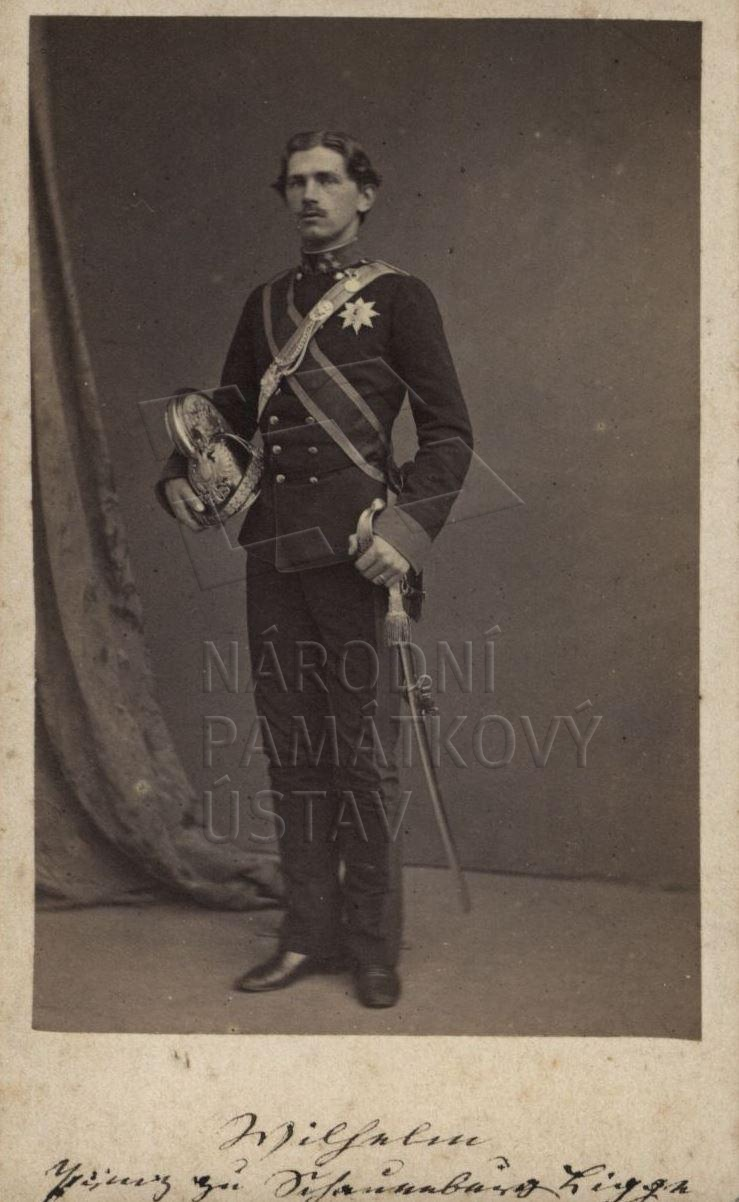
Prince William in uniform, c. 1860s

William was born at Bückeburg, Schaumburg-Lippe on 12 December 1834. He was the seventh child, and third son, of George William, Prince of Schaumburg-Lippe, and Princess Ida of Waldeck and Pyrmont. Among his siblings were Prince Adolphus I (reigning Prince of Schaumburg-Lippe) and Princess Adelheid (wife of Friedrich, reigning Duke of Schleswig-Holstein-Sonderburg-Glücksburg).

His paternal grandparents were Philip II, Count of Schaumburg-Lippe and Landgravine Juliane of Hesse-Philippsthal. His maternal grandparents were George I, Prince of Waldeck and Pyrmont and Princess Augusta of Schwarzburg-Sondershausen.

The closest person to him was his mother, Princess Ida, and little Prince William also attached himself to her with deep love, a familiar, close relationship that lasted until the princess's death.

Several trips with his royal parents had pleasantly interrupted the young prince's years of teaching and service. The related princely courts were visited and Prince William (as well as the other princely children) accompanied his parents several times to Náchod and Ratibořice Castle, which Prince Georg Wilhelm had purchased from his relative, Count Oktavio of Lippe-Weissenfeld (1808–1885) in 1842. Prince William was last in Ratibořice with his parents and Princesses Ida and his sister, Elisabeth in the summer and autumn of 1853. Princess Ida traveled back to Bückeburg in August, the others still stayed in Ratibořice and had to postpone their departure because first, his father, George William, Prince of Schaumburg-Lippe himself fell ill with a fever, which soon passed, but then Prince William became seriously ill with rheumatic fever, which degenerated into a malignant nervous fever.

== Military career ==
Prince William served as an officer in the Austrian Imperial Army.

== Personal life ==
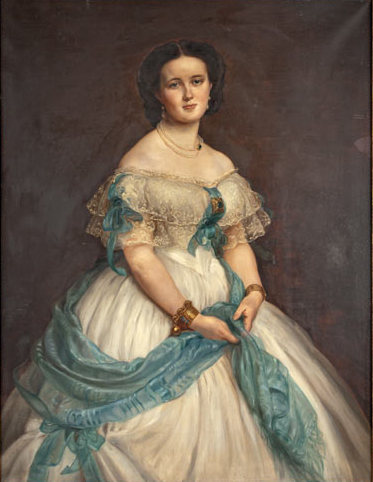
Portrait of Princess Bathildis, c. 1860s

On 30 May 1862, William was married to Princess Bathildis of Anhalt-Dessau at Dessau. The Princess was a daughter of Prince Frederick Augustus of Anhalt-Dessau, and his wife, Princess Marie Luise Charlotte of Hesse-Kassel.

Together, they were the parents of eight children:

- Princess Charlotte of Schaumburg-Lippe (1864–1946), who married King William II of Württemberg, in 1886; no issue.
- Prince Franz Joseph of Schaumburg-Lippe (1865–1881), who died unmarried.
- Prince Frederick of Schaumburg-Lippe (1868–1945), who married Princess Louise of Denmark, a daughter of King Frederick VIII, in 1896; had issue. After her death in 1906, he married Princess Antoinette of Anhalt, daughter of Prince Leopold of Anhalt, in 1909.
- Prince Albrecht of Schaumburg-Lippe (1869–1942), who married Duchess Elsa of Württemberg, eldest daughter of Duke Eugen of Württemberg and Grand Duchess Vera of Russia, in 1897; had issue.
- Prince Maximilian of Schaumburg-Lippe (1871–1904), who married Duchess Olga of Württemberg, younger sister of Duchess Elsa, in 1898; had issue.
  - Prince Eugen of Schaumburg-Lippe (1899–1929)
- Princess Bathildis of Schaumburg-Lippe (1873–1962), who married Friedrich, Prince of Waldeck and Pyrmont, son of George Victor, Prince of Waldeck and Pyrmont and Princess Helena of Nassau, in 1895; had issue.
- Princess Adelaide of Schaumburg-Lippe (1875–1971), who married Ernst II, Duke of Saxe-Altenburg, son of Georg, Duke of Saxe-Altenburg and Princess Augusta of Saxe-Meiningen, in 1898. They had issue before their divorce in 1920.
- Princess Alexandra Karoline of Schaumburg-Lippe (1879–1949), was scheduled to marry King Alexander I of Serbia, but against the wishes of his parents, he married instead Draga Mašin, his mother's lady-in-waiting. In 1901, her name was also linked to Prince George of Greece and Denmark and later in 1905 to Prince Eitel Friedrich of Prussia, but nothing came out of it. She remained single and never married.

== Death ==
Prince William and his daughter-in-law, Princess Louise of Denmark, died on 4 April 1906, five hours apart at the family castle in Náchod, Bohemia. His cause of death was from heart trouble while, hers was from meningitis.

His body was, along with the one of his daughter-in-law Louise, interred in the Vojenský Hřbitov (Military Cemetery), Nachod, Bohemia, at that time part of the Austro-Hungarian Empire.

== Honours ==
- Ascanian duchies: Grand Cross of the House Order of Albert the Bear, 14 January 1856
- Nassau: Knight of the Order of the Gold Lion of the House of Nassau, July 1864
- Mecklenburg: Grand Cross of the House Order of the Wendish Crown, with Crown in Ore, 21 March 1868
- (Austrian Empire) (Kingdom of Hungary) Austria-Hungary:
  - Knight of the Imperial Order of the Iron Crown, 1st Class, 1875
  - Grand Cross of the Austrian Imperial Order of Leopold, 1899
- (Saxe-Coburg and Gotha) (Duchy of Saxe-Altenburg) (Saxe-Meiningen) Ernestine duchies: Grand Cross of the Saxe-Ernestine House Order, 1882
- Baden:
  - Knight of the House Order of Fidelity, 1885
  - Knight of the Order of Berthold the First, 1885
- Württemberg: Grand Cross of the Order of the Württemberg Crown, 1886

== Ancestry ==
Ancestors of Prince William of Schaumburg-Lippe

8. Frederick Ernst, Count of Lippe-Alverdissen
4. Philip II, Count of Schaumburg-Lippe
9. Elisabeth Philippine von Friesenhausen
2. George William, Prince of Schaumburg-Lippe
10. William, Landgrave of Hesse-Philippsthal
5. Landgravine Juliane of Hesse-Philippsthal
11. Landgravine Ulrica Eleonore of Hesse-Philippsthal-Barchfeld
1. Prince William of Schaumburg-Lippe
12. Karl August, Prince of Waldeck and Pyrmont
6. George I, Prince of Waldeck and Pyrmont
13. Countess Palatine Christiane Henriette of Zweibrücken-Birkenfeld
3. Princess Ida of Waldeck and Pyrmont
14. August II, Prince of Schwarzburg-Sondershausen
7. Princess Augusta of Schwarzburg-Sondershausen
15. Princess Christine of Anhalt-Bernburg

== Notes and sources ==
- L'Allemagne dynastique, Huberty, Giraud, Magdelaine, Reference: II 269
