= Princess Bathildis of Anhalt-Dessau =

Princess of Schaumburg-Lippe

Princess Bathildis
- Princess of Anhalt-Dessau
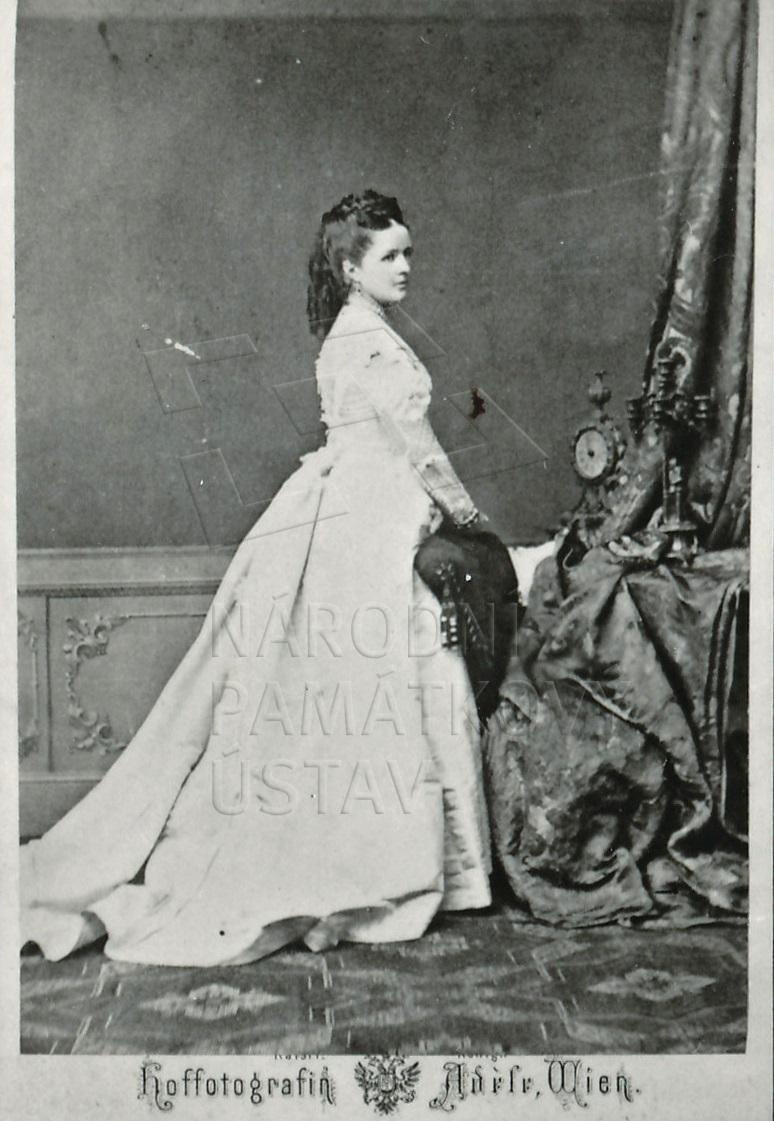
- Photograph of Princess Bathildis c. 1860s–1870s

Princess of Schaumburg-Lippe
- Born: 29 December 1837; Dessau, Anhalt-Dessau, German Confederation
- Died: 10 February 1902 (aged 64); Náchod Castle, Kingdom of Bohemia, Austria-Hungary
- Spouse: Prince William of Schaumburg-Lippe (m. 1862)
- Issue Detail: Charlotte, Queen of Württemberg; Prince Franz Joseph; Prince Friedrich; Prince Albrecht; Prince Maximilian; Bathildis, Princess of Waldeck and Pyrmont; Adelaide, Duchess of Saxe-Altenburg; Princess Alexandra
Names
- German: Bathildis Amalgunde
- House: Anhalt (by birth); Lippe (by marriage)
- Father: Prince Frederick Augustus of Anhalt-Dessau
- Mother: Princess Marie Luise Charlotte of Hesse-Kassel

Princess Bathildis of Anhalt-Dessau (German: Prinzessin Bathildis Amalgunde von Anhalt-Dessau; 29 December 1837 – 10 February 1902) was a Princess of Anhalt-Dessau, and therefore member of the House of Anhalt by birth. As the wife of Prince William of Schaumburg-Lippe, she was a Princess of Schaumburg-Lippe by marriage.

== Early life ==
Bathildis was born in Dessau as the second child of Prince Frederick Augustus of Anhalt-Dessau (son of Frederick, Hereditary Prince of Anhalt-Dessau and Landgravine Amalie of Hesse-Homburg) and his wife Princess Marie Luise Charlotte of Hesse-Kassel (daughter of Landgrave William of Hesse-Kassel and Princess Charlotte of Denmark).

She was the younger sister of Adelaide-Marie of Anhalt-Dessau, Grand Duchess of Luxembourg from 1890 to 1905.

== Marriage ==
On 30 May 1862 at Dessau, Bathildis married Prince William of Schaumburg-Lippe, seventh child and third son of George William, Prince of Schaumburg-Lippe and his wife, Princess Ida of Waldeck and Pyrmont.

They had eight children:

- Princess Charlotte of Schaumburg-Lippe (10 October 1864 – 16 July 1946), married in 1886 to William II of Württemberg, no issue.
- Prince Franz Joseph of Schaumburg-Lippe (8 October 1865 – 4 September 1881)
- Prince Frederick of Schaumburg-Lippe (30 January 1868 – 12 December 1945), married in 1896 to Princess Louise of Denmark, had issue.
- Prince Albrecht of Schaumburg-Lippe (24 October 1869 – 25 December 1942), married in 1897 to Duchess Elsa of Württemberg, had issue. Albrecht and Elsa are the maternal grandparents of Philipp-Ernst, Prince of Schaumburg-Lippe.
- Prince Maximilian of Schaumburg-Lippe (13 March 1871 – 1 April 1904), married in 1898 to Duchess Olga of Württemberg, had issue, including the Prince Eugen of Schaumburg-Lippe.
- Princess Bathildis of Schaumburg-Lippe (21 May 1873 – 6 April 1962), married in 1895 to Friedrich, Prince of Waldeck and Pyrmont, had issue.
- Princess Adelaide of Schaumburg-Lippe (22 September 1875 – 27 January 1971), married in 1898 to Ernst II, Duke of Saxe-Altenburg, had issue, divorced in 1920.
- Princess Alexandra of Schaumburg-Lippe (9 June 1879 – 5 January 1949)

== Later life ==
Princess Bathildis died on 10 February 1902 at Náchod Castle, Kingdom of Bohemia (now the Czech Republic), aged 64.

== Ancestry ==
Ancestors of Princess Bathildis of Anhalt-Dessau

16. Leopold II, Prince of Anhalt-Dessau
8. Leopold III, Duke of Anhalt-Dessau
17. Gisela Agnes of Anhalt-Köthen
4. Frederick, Hereditary Prince of Anhalt-Dessau
18. Frederick Henry, Margrave of Brandenburg-Schwedt
9. Margravine Louise of Brandenburg-Schwedt
19. Leopoldine Marie of Anhalt-Dessau
2. Prince Frederick Augustus of Anhalt-Dessau
20. Frederick IV, Landgrave of Hesse-Homburg
10. Frederick V, Landgrave of Hesse-Homburg
21. Ulrike Louise of Solms-Braunfels
5. Landgravine Amalie of Hesse-Homburg
22. Louis IX, Landgrave of Hesse-Darmstadt
11. Landgravine Caroline of Hesse-Darmstadt
23. Countess Palatine Caroline of Zweibrücken
1. Princess Bathildis of Anhalt-Dessau
24. Frederick II, Landgrave of Hesse-Kassel
12. Prince Frederick of Hesse-Kassel
25. Princess Mary of Great Britain
6. Prince William of Hesse-Kassel
26. Charles William, Prince of Nassau-Usingen
13. Princess Caroline of Nassau-Usingen
27. Countess Caroline Felizitas of Leiningen-Dagsburg
3. Princess Marie Luise Charlotte of Hesse-Kassel
28. Frederick V of Denmark
14. Frederick, Hereditary Prince of Denmark
29. Juliana Maria of Brunswick-Wolfenbüttel
7. Princess Louise Charlotte of Denmark
30. Duke Louis of Mecklenburg-Schwerin
15. Duchess Sophia Frederica of Mecklenburg-Schwerin
31. Princess Charlotte Sophie of Saxe-Coburg-Saalfeld
