= Prince Friedrich Sigismund of Prussia (1891–1927) =

Prussian prince and fighter pilot (1891–1927)

Friedrich Sigismund
- Friedrich Sigismund, 1916 or 1917
- Born: 17 December 1891; Jagdschloss Klein-Glienicke, Berlin, Kingdom of Prussia
- Died: 6 July 1927 (aged 35); Lucerne, Switzerland
- Burial: Glienicke Palace
- Spouse: Marie Louise of Schaumburg-Lippe (m. 1916)
- Issue: Princess Louise Viktoria; Prince Friedrich Karl
- House: Hohenzollern
- Father: Prince Friedrich Leopold of Prussia
- Mother: Princess Louise Sophie of Schleswig-Holstein-Sonderburg-Augustenburg

Prince Joachim Viktor Wilhelm Leopold Friedrich Sigismund of Prussia (17 December 1891 – 6 July 1927) was a German World War I fighter pilot and member of the House of Hohenzollern as the son of Prince Friedrich Leopold of Prussia and Princess Louise Sophie of Schleswig-Holstein-Sonderburg-Augustenburg.

== Early life ==
At Glienicke Castle, Prince Joachim Viktor Wilhelm Leopold Friedrich Sigismund was born to Prince Friedrich Leopold of Prussia and his wife Princess Louise Sophie of Schleswig-Holstein-Sonderburg-Augustenburg on 17 December 1891. He was their second child and eldest son; his siblings would come to include Princess Victoria Margaret, Prince Friedrich Karl, and Prince Friedrich Leopold.

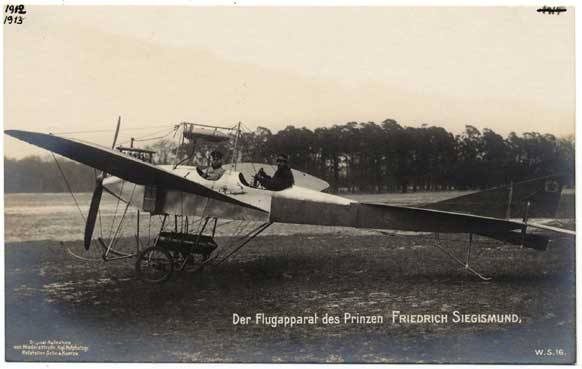
Waiting to be taken-off

Like some other Hohenzollerns like Prince Heinrich of Prussia, Friedrich was greatly interested in aviation. In 1911, he began building an aeroplane at Glenicke Castle, with the hopes of trying it out the following spring. In 1917, he and his brother Friedrich Karl joined the German flying corps. Later that year, his brother died from war wounds.

== Marriage and issue ==
On 27 April 1916, he married at Jagdschloss Klein-Glienicke in Berlin Princess Marie Louise of Schaumburg-Lippe (b. 10 February 1897, Oldenburg - d. 1 October 1938, Potsdam) (a daughter of Prince Friedrich of Schaumburg-Lippe and Princess Louise of Denmark).

They had two children:

- Louise Victoria Margaret Antoinette Sieglinde Alexandrine Stephanie Thyra (b. 23 August 1917 – d. 23 March 2009), married Hans Reinhold (b. 20 November 1917 – d. 2002) on 12 September 1942 in Potsdam. They had one son before divorcing in 1949:
  - Manfred Reinhold (b. 13 February 1943)
- Friedrich Karl Viktor Stefan Christian (b. 13 March 1919, Jagdschloss Glienicke – d. 19 June 2006, Mallorca), married Lady Hermione Mary Morton Stuart (2 March 1925 – 2 September 1969) and secondly Adelheid von Bockum-Dolffs (born 16 September 1943). Died with no issue.

== Death ==
He and his wife were great lovers of riding and horses, and he was considered one of the best horsemen in Germany. The couple spent most of their time raising and training horses at their Mecklenburg estate, as well as at their estate at Glienicke Castle near Potsdam. He and his wife were great social favorites, and Friedrich was popular with the German people.

On 5 July 1927 at age 35 at Lucerne, Switzerland, Frederich Sigismund fell from a horse. He was riding in an international tournament; while doing a difficult jump, he fell and his foot got caught in a stirrup. Before he was able to free himself, the horse trod his chest multiple times, breaking five ribs and causing other injuries. He was rushed to a nearby hospital, where he died the following day from his injuries.

His body was brought back to Potsdam, where a ceremonial funeral was held. Important members of the Hohenzollern dynasty attended, including former Crown Prince Wilhelm and his brother Prince Eitel Friedrich of Prussia. He was buried at Glienicke Palace, next to his sister Princess Victoria Margaret of Prussia.

== Regimental commissions ==
- 1. Garderegiment zu Fuß (1st Regiment of Foot Guards), Leutnant à la suite from 1901; Leutnant by 1908.
- 2. Leib-Husaren-Regiment Königin Viktoria von Preußen Nr. 2, Rittmeister (captain of cavalry), during World War I
- Fliegerabteilung 22 (aerial observer squadron), 1917–1918

== Chivalric orders ==
- Knight of the Order of the Black Eagle, 17 December 1901
- Grand Cross of the Order of the Red Eagle, with Crown, 1901
- Knight of the Order of the Prussian Crown, 1st Class, 1901
- Grand Commander's Cross of the Royal House Order of Hohenzollern, 17 December 1901

== Military decorations (1914-1918) ==
- Iron Cross, Second Class
- Iron Cross, First Class
- Flugzeugführerabzeichen (Pilot's qualification badge)

== Ancestry ==
Ancestors of Prince Friedrich Sigismund of Prussia (1891–1927)

8. Prince Charles of Prussia
4. Prince Friedrich Karl of Prussia
9. Princess Marie of Saxe-Weimar-Eisenach
2. Prince Friedrich Leopold of Prussia
10. Leopold IV, Duke of Anhalt
5. Princess Maria Anna of Anhalt-Dessau
11. Princess Frederica of Prussia
1. Prince Friedrich Sigismund of Prussia
12. Christian August II, Duke of Schleswig-Holstein-Sonderburg-Augustenburg
6. Frederick VIII, Duke of Schleswig-Holstein
13. Countess Louise Danneskiold-Samsøe
3. Princess Louise Sophie of Schleswig-Holstein-Sonderburg-Augustenburg
14. Ernst I, Prince of Hohenlohe-Langenburg
7. Princess Adelheid of Hohenlohe-Langenburg
15. Princess Feodora of Leiningen

== Sources ==
- Zivkovic, Georg: Heer- und Flottenführer der Welt. Biblio Verlag, Osnabrück, 1971 S. 427-428 ISBN 3-7648-0666-4
- C. Arnold McNaughton: The Book of Kings: A Royal Genealogy, in 3 volumes (London, U.K.: Garnstone Press, 1973), volume 1, page 67.
