= Ratibořice Castle =

Ratibořice
- zámek Ratibořice
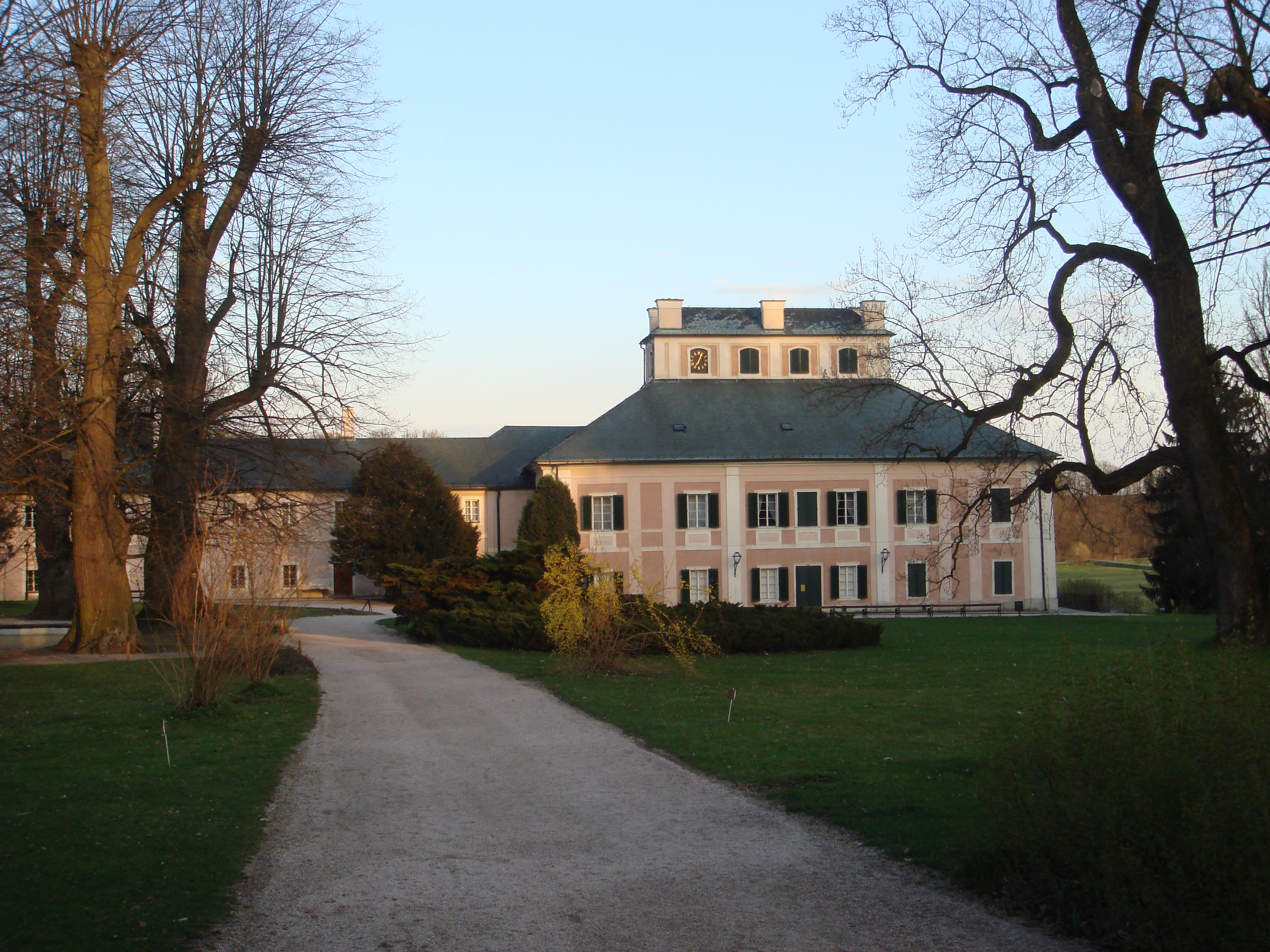
- Ratibořice Château

- Location within Czech Republic

General information
- Type: Château
- Architectural style: Baroque
- Location: Česká Skalice, Hradec Králové Region, Česká Skalice, Czech Republic
- Coordinates: 50°24′53″N 16°3′9″E
- Opened: 1708

Website
- www.zamekratiborice.cz

Ratibořice Château (Czech: zámek Ratibořice) is a chateau in Ratibořice village (part of Česká Skalice) in the Hradec Králové Region of the Czech Republic. It stands on an elevated plain below which valley in the bend of the Úpa river widens. Together with Babiččino údolí (Grandmother's valley), situated between Česká Skalice and Havlovice, it offers the Baroque architecture and Bohemian landscape, ranking among the best-known and most-frequented places in East Bohemia. They have become well known to the general public thanks to Babička (The Grandmother), the most famous work of the writer Božena Němcová.

== History ==
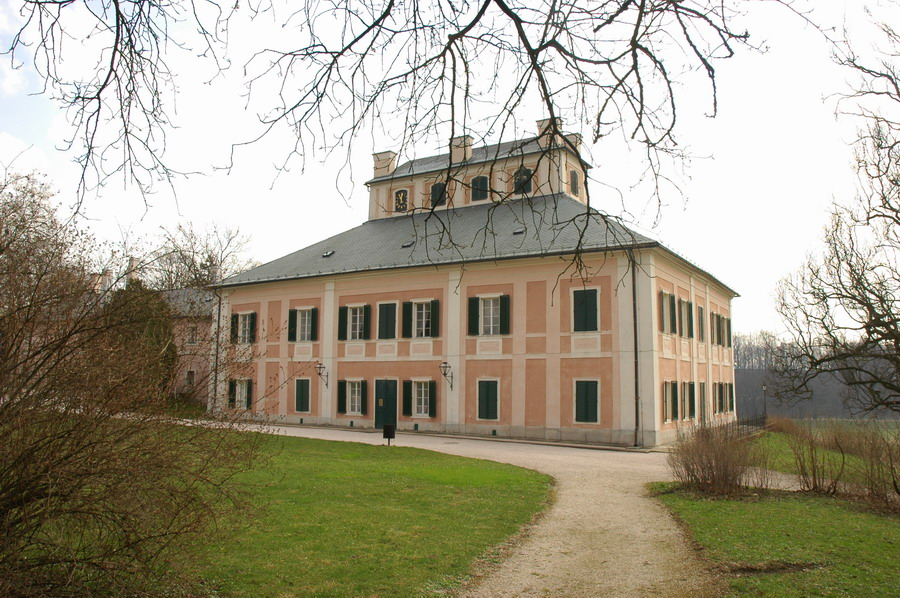
Lateral view of the Château

=== Estate ===
In the Middle Ages a village named Ratibořice was a farm. Situated above it, on the site called "On Old Ratibořice", was a knights' stronghold which was mentioned in 1388 as the seat of Vaněk of Žampach. In 1464 Ratibořice was purchased by Aleš of Rýzmburk. At the time of Petr Andršpach of Dubá, the stronghold was attached to the Rýzmburk estate. In 1534 it was described already in the Land Rolls as deserted. About the year 1565 it was repaired again, but after 1582, during the period of rule of the Smiřický family and after its attachment to the Náchod estate, it definitely ceased to exist.

After the Battle of the White Mountain, the Trčka family owned the estate from 1623 to 1634, its last Czech owner being Adam Erdman Trčka, who lost his life along with Albrecht of Valdštejn during the so-called "Cheb Execution". The emperor Ferdinand II bestowed the confiscated estate on the Italian noble Ottavio Piccolomini "for his royal services".

=== Construction ===
In the years 1702 to 1708 the then owner of the estate Lorenzo Piccolomini had a Baroque summer palace built at Ratibořice which he intended to use for summer sojourns and in hunting period. The small château was built in the style of Italian country villas and similarly as the château at Hostivice and Kácov, it ranked among the unique samples of this type of lordly seat in this country.

The building, erected on a slightly rhomboid ground-plan, has one storey, a hipped roof and an unusual roof structure with six chimneys. Both the ground-floor and the first floor have one large hall lined with residential chambers. The two oppositely situated staircases are inserted in the centre of the layout. The former chapel now lies below the level of the ground-floor of the servants' wing, built in the latter half of the 18th century.

In 1792 the indebted estate was purchased by Duke of Courland and Semigallia, Peter von Biron. In 1795 the duke renounced his Duchy (Courland) to the Empress Catherine II and moved permanently to his lordships of Sagan (Zaháň) and Náchod. Ratibořice became Petr Biron's favorite summer seat.

=== Reconstruction ===
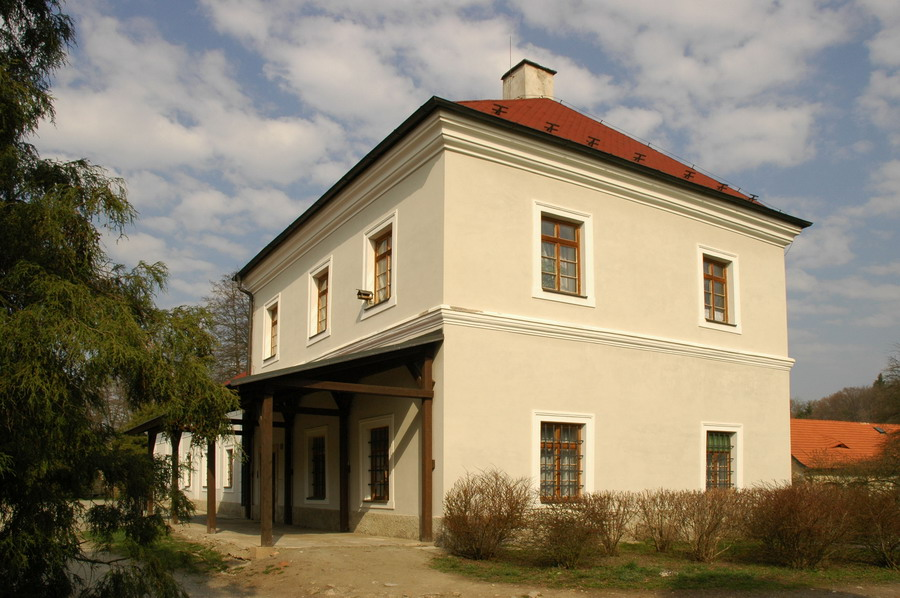
Ratibořice - Mandl (Mangle)

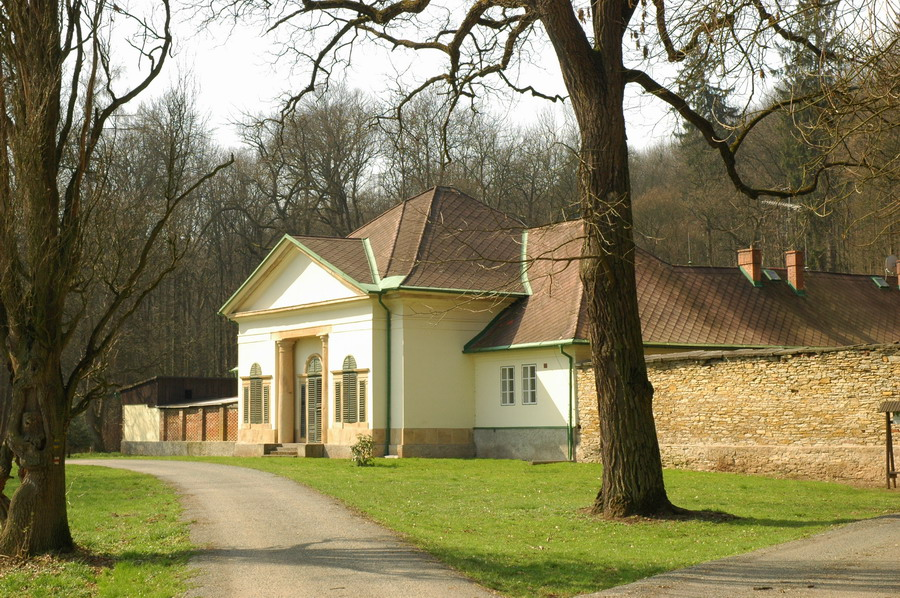
Lovecký Zámeček

After the duke's death in 1800 the Náchod estate was inherited by Petr's daughter Kateřina Frederika Benigna, Duchess of Zaháň, known from B. Němcová's novel's Babička, as the “lady princess”. The beautiful and brilliantly minded duchess was brought up in the spirit of romanticism of the time. She surrounded herself with a prominent circle of friends from the ranks of artists, philosophers and politicians and devoted her attention to social events, politics and travel. Klemen Brühl, the family historian, wrote the following about her: “She is remarkable mature, she has a beautiful figure and face, she is proud and full of dignity, she enchants everyone with her kindness and female weakness.”

After its reconstruction in the years 1825 to 1826 the château acquired the form of an elegant seat in the late Central European Classical and Empire style. The environs in the spacious natural landscape park were adjusted simultaneously with the reconstruction work on the château building. Before its reconstruction was started the duchess made the château available for diplomatic negotiations between her friend of many years, the Austrian chancellor K.W.L. Metternich, and representatives of Russia and Prussia. Similarly as at nearby Opočno, members of the future “Holy Alliance” discussed the question of their common measures against the Emperor Napoleon of France. Kateřina Zaháňská ranked among the passionate opponents of the “great conqueror” and rendered assistance and support to everyone who helped to accelerate his fall.

In 1839 Kateřina Zaháňská died and the estate was inherited by her sister Paulina. She resided permanently on the estates in Prussia and soon sold the estate in Bohemia. In the years 1840 to 1842 it was the property of the Count Oktavio of Lippe-Weissenfeld (1808-1885), from whom it was bought by one of his relations, George William, Prince of Schaumburg-Lippe, for 2.5 million gold florins. Apart from the château at Náchod, Ratibořice and Chvalkovice, some 113 villages and small towns, large forests and mines at Statoňovice belonged to the estate at that time. On his death in 1860, the estates were taken over by his youngest son Prince William of Schaumburg-Lippe, founder of the Náchod branch of the family.

It was at that time that Ratibořice Château was subjected to its last important reconstruction. The plasters were broken up by pilasters, a new stove was installed in the interior, the walls were newly papered and the servants’ wing was reconstructed. On 8 June 1866 one of the battles of the Prussian-Austrian War was fought at Česká Skalice, situated near Ratibořice. After the war the Schaumburg family expended considerable sums on the renewal of the destroyed farm and also had a number of war memorials erected at their own cost. The Emperor Franz Joseph I of Austria visited Ratibořice during his tour of the battlefields of this war in 1866.

The last owner of the château was Prince Bedřích Schaumburg-Lippe. During World War II it was occupied by the German army and in 1945 it became state property. In 1976 Ratibořice Château and the whole area of Babičičino údolí were proclaimed a National Cultural Monument. After the completion of the complex restoration of the château in 1991 the interior of the building was once again made accessible to the public. In 1994 the ground-floor was also opened to visitors.

== The Château ==
=== Entrance Hall ===
Furnished with a set of original classical chairs, landscape paintings of the 17th and 18th centuries and two marble busts. Then follows the Biedermaier “Study” where a part of the new château library is housed in one of the original cabinets. The remainder of the former rich library of Kateřina Zaháňská was merged with the Náchod library in the latter half of the 19th century. Worthy of attention is a mobile cabinet with several drawers and a gilded cupola – the household pharmacy. The two busts of biscuit china belong in the small collection of products from the royal manufactory in Copenhagen. It comes from the property of the wife of the last owner of the château, Prince Bedřich. She was Princess Louise of Denmark, third child and oldest daughter of King Frederik VIII of Denmark and his wife, Louise of Sweden.

=== Reception Salon ===
The Reception Salon is hung with portraits of members of the Schaumburg-Lippe family and the Danish kings. Another part of the collection from the production of the royal china manufactory in Copenhagen is also displayed here in a cabinet.

=== Social and music salon ===
It was intended for social games and refreshment in the form of a cup of coffee or chocolate. The pattern of the wallpapers and the furnishings fall in the fading Classical period of the late 18th century and The Music Salon is furnished in Napoleocic Empire style and is provided with comfortable seating furniture with a number of musical instruments like a Streicher piano from Vienna.

=== Salon of the Three Emperors ===
The main stand room on the first floor is the Salon of the Three Emperors, whose name symbolically expresses the importance of Ratibořice during the Napoleonic wars. The Late Empire furniture is supplemented with a bronze clock from France and canvasses with mythological themes.

=== Ladies Salon ===
While the gentlemen discussed political and military events over a cigar and a glass of wine, the Ladies’ Salon, also prevailingly representative of the Second Rococo style, witnessed conservations about fashion. The interior is dominated by a portrait of Princess Louisa of Denmark by the painter Otto Bastr and a two-part bureau of hard polished wood. The atmosphere of the Ladies’ Salon is enhanced by two classical mirrors hanging on the sides of the French windows.

=== Summer Dining-hall ===
The former garden room now serves as the Summer Dining-hall. A Neo-Baroque suite of furniture, complemented with blue vessels from the English Copenland manufactory, and the official portraits of princess Louisa's parents – King Frederik VIII and Queen Louisa of Denmark - stand out well in this interior. The solemn character of the room is emphasized by drapes and a tablecloth of emerald green velvet.

=== Schaumburg Room ===
Also called “the corner” has the character of a living room of the first half of the 19th century. Hanging above a chest of drawers with an alabaster clock is a representative portrait of Princess Bathildis and situated opposite it, between the windows, a portrait of her husband, Prince Vilém Karel Scaummburg-Lippe, in a uniform adorned with the family and Austrian orders.

=== Graphic Chamber ===
The Graphic Chamber fulfils the function of a connecting room and it gained its name due to the interesting collection of small paintings with subjects taken from the Dessau-Wörlitz Garden Realm.

=== Study ===
The Study evokes to the greatest extent the atmosphere of the environment in which the Ratibořice “lord of the manor” lived in the latter half of the 19th century. The suite of furniture featuring the Second Rococo style is supplemented with a screen, the gift of the officers of the “Nádasdy” Hussar Regiment No. 9 to their commanding officer Prince Bedřich, whose portrait in the uniform of a Hungarian general hangs above the sofa. The large round vase from Copenhagen on the corner shelf also attracts great attention.

=== Chamber of the Princess ===
The best-known room in the entire château is the Chamber of the Princess, which inspired that the writer Božena Němcová to set the plot for one of the chapters of her novel Babička. Kateřina Zaháňská's bent for travelling is brought to mind by a group of fourteen water colour artists portraying landscapes from the environs of Lake Como and Lake Maggiore in Italy. This interior is the last of the state rooms, which are followed by private chambers.

Situated beyond the connecting passage is the Foster-daughters’ Chamber, which is imbued with the atmosphere of Biedermeier comfort and good cheer and evokes memories of another well-known character of Babička - Countess Hortensie. The Antechamber is the last room on the first floor, and includes a multi-coloured painted Viennese vase with a Classical motif.

=== Bedchamber and toilet room ===
The bedchamber contains marriage beds with the carved alliance emblem of the Schaumburgs and Saxon Anhalt. The drapes and bed covers are made of red velvet. The toilet room, equipped with a washing set, a small table and a rotating mirror, a screen and a clothes stand, has a purely private character. The displayed uniform of Bedřich – a Hungarian general, complemented with accessories including a sword – is an item of great interest. The demolition of the old farm and its relocation at a greater distance from the château in 1811 created space for the laying-out of a Château Park.

== Château Park ==
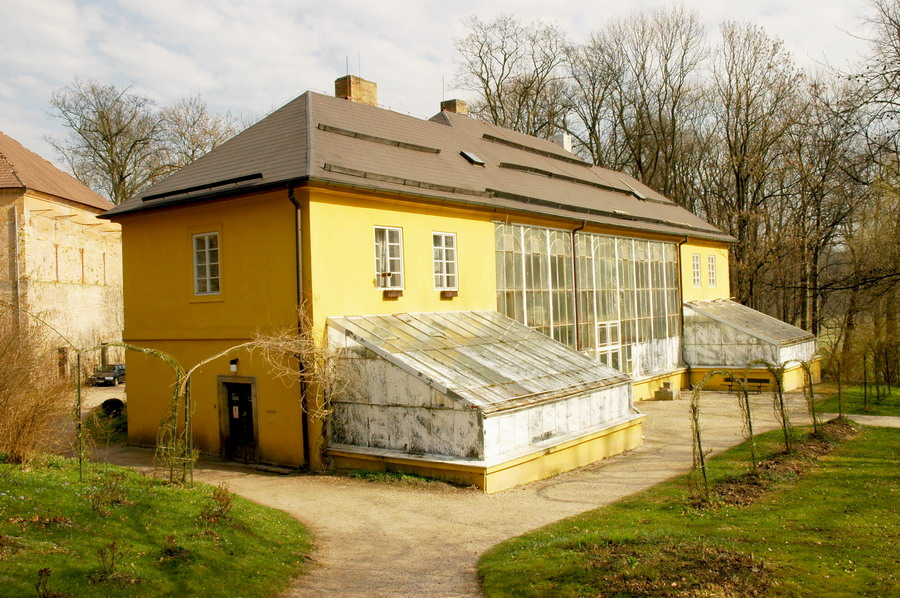
The so-called "Pineapple house", The Greenhouse

Kateřina Zaháňská had it designed and realized in the then fashionable English style. Originally she had a whole number of foreign, mainly North American trees planted in it. The first château gardener was a Czech named Karel Binder, his successor being Gottlich Bosse, to whom the main credit for the building-up of the park is attributed.

The former watering-place for cattle was lent the form of a lake and in 1830 a greenhouse. The so-called “pineapple house”, was built by the lower edge of the park. It stands on the site of the original Old Bleaching Ground where in reality Barunka Panklová spent her early childhood. The later flat of the Pankl family is situated behind the greenhouse, on the ground-floor of the former barn.

The fenced-in park surrounding the château passed into a more openly designed landscape parl which comprised the whole of the present valley Babičičino udolí, from 1952 a Landscape and Nature Preserve and now a National Natural Monument. A path called “Bathildina stezka” (Bathilda's Path) runs into the valley from the château park. On the way to the mill, we pass along the high brick wall of the former manorial garden called “Květnice” (Flower Garden) of 1801.

=== Mill ===
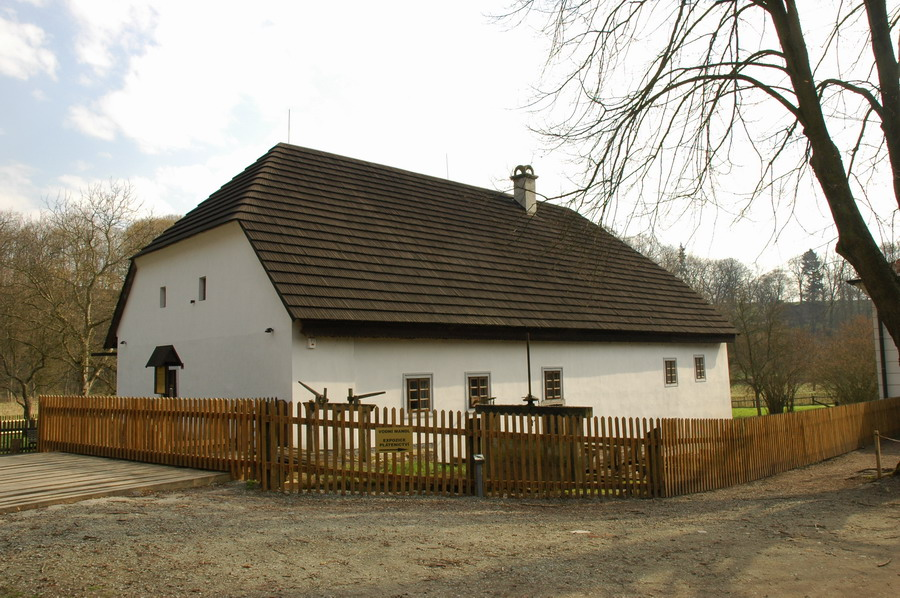
Ludrův mlýn (Ludra's Mill)

It is a one-storey stone building with a built-on room for the common use of the farm hands and an out-building in the fenced-in yard. The greater part of the building is taken up by the so-called Milling Chamber, which is equipped with historic milling facilities of the 19th century. It is situated on the ground-floor and the first floor. On the ground-floor there also used to be a bakery with two chambers, while the first floor was occupied by the miller's flat consisting of two rooms. The miller's room is furnished in early 19th century village style, while Mančinka's room, on the contrary, has a furniture of the character of a town burgher's home.

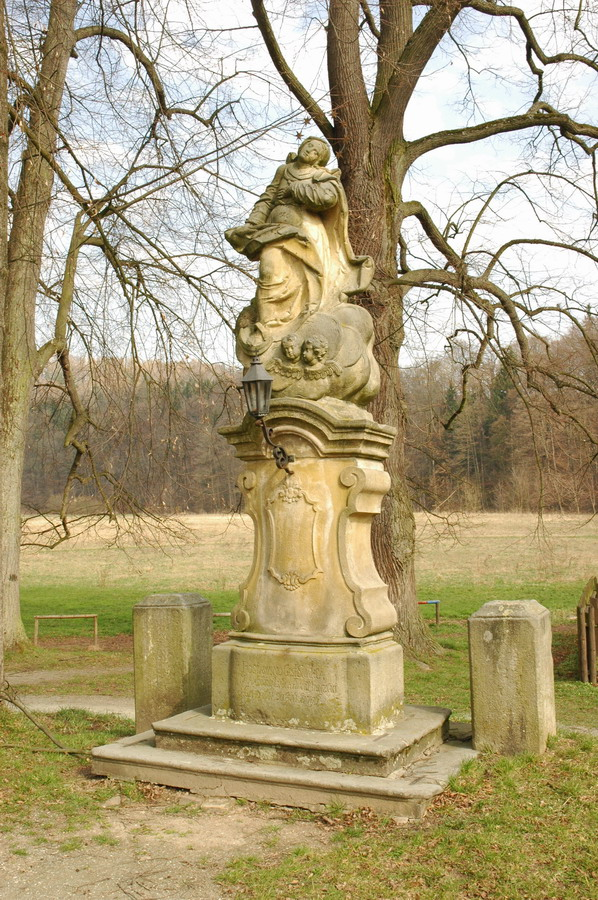
Statue of the Virgin Mary

The miller Antonín Ruder ranked among the wealthy freeholders of the time. He acquired the mill through marriage and in 1773 it was rebuilt by the grandfather of Barunka's friend Mančinka, Antonín Ruder. His son, “pan otec” (Mr. father), i.e. the miller from the novel Babička, sold the mill to the Schaumburgs in 1842. This family had a Late Empire building containing a fishing room and a Mangle built on the opposite bank of the mill drive.

Standing under the lime tree in front of the mill is a Statue of the Virgin Mary which, as the donation inscription of 1796 tell us, was erected at the cost of the Ratibořice miller Antonín Ruder and his wife Anna.

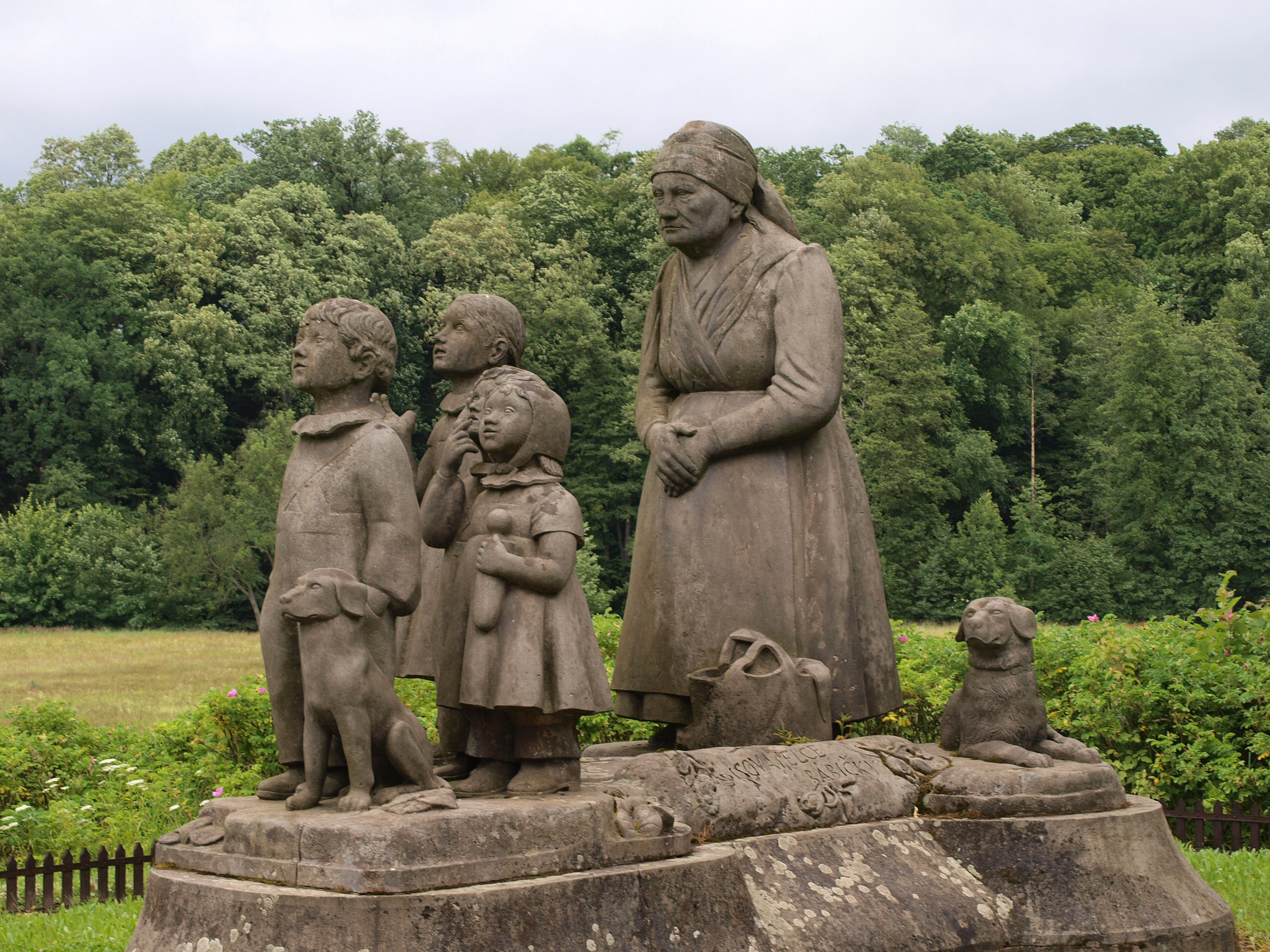
The Grandmother and Her Children monument

If we walk upstream of the mill drive we find ourselves – after covering a little less than one hundred metres – standing by one of the symbols of Ratibořice. It is a monument called Grandmother and Her Grandchildren. Its foundation stone was laid in July 1920 on the occasion of the hundredth anniversary of the birth of the writer Božena Němcová. The solemn unveiling of the monument took place on 9 July 1922 and was widely attended by societies, corporations and prominent persons from the whole republic. The group of statues was realized in sandstone by the sculptor Otto Gutfreund after his own design in whose case he cooperated with the architect Professor Pavel Janák.

Standing opposite the monument by the drive is the former “Panská hospoda” (Manorial Inn). Along with a forge, it already stood here in the 16th century. From 1738 the Celba family ran the place. Kristila, Barunka's older friend, was the daughter of the innkeeper František Celba and his wife Anna. It was from 1858 that the inn began to be called “Manorial Inn”, it being in that year that prince Jiří Vilém Scahumburg-Lippe purchased it from Dominik Celba. In 1898 the composer Karel Kovařovic lived here, being inspired by the locality to write his opera "Na Starém bělidle" (On the Old Bleaching Ground).

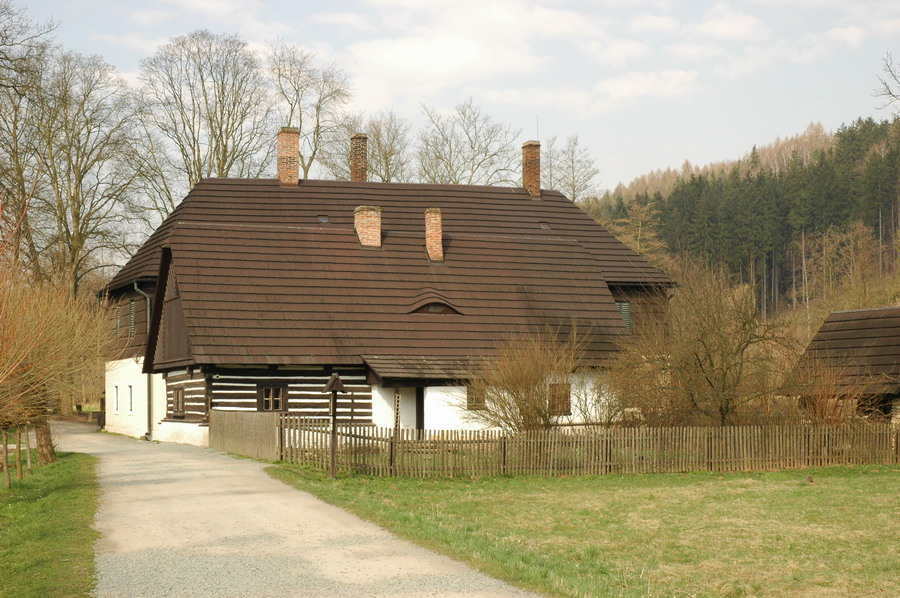
Staré Bělidlo (Old Bleaching Ground)

=== Old Bleaching Ground ===
The Old Bleaching Ground (Staré bělidlo) is one of the best-known folk structures in the Czech Republic. The timber-frame cottage with a shingle roof was built in 1797 by the miller Antonín Ruder as a home for his grandparents. In 1842 it was bought along with the mill by the then owner of the estate, Prince J.W. Schaumburg-Lippe, who had a one-storeyed building containing a laundry and a pressing room built-on on to it.

In spite of the fact that Kateřina Zaháňská had the Old Bleaching Ground demolished in connection with the adaptations and enlargement of the park, it was just here that Božena Němcová situated the plot of her novel Babička.

Furnished according to the narration of the writer – with period furniture and small articles from the property of the Božena Němcová Museum at Česká Skalice.

=== Viktorka's Weir ===
The original wooden weir had been adjusted several times during the latter half of the 19th century in connection with the construction of a larger irrigation system for the Ratibořice meadow. The most recent reconstruction of the weir were carried out in the course of the regulation of the River Úpa in the 20s and 50s the 20th century.

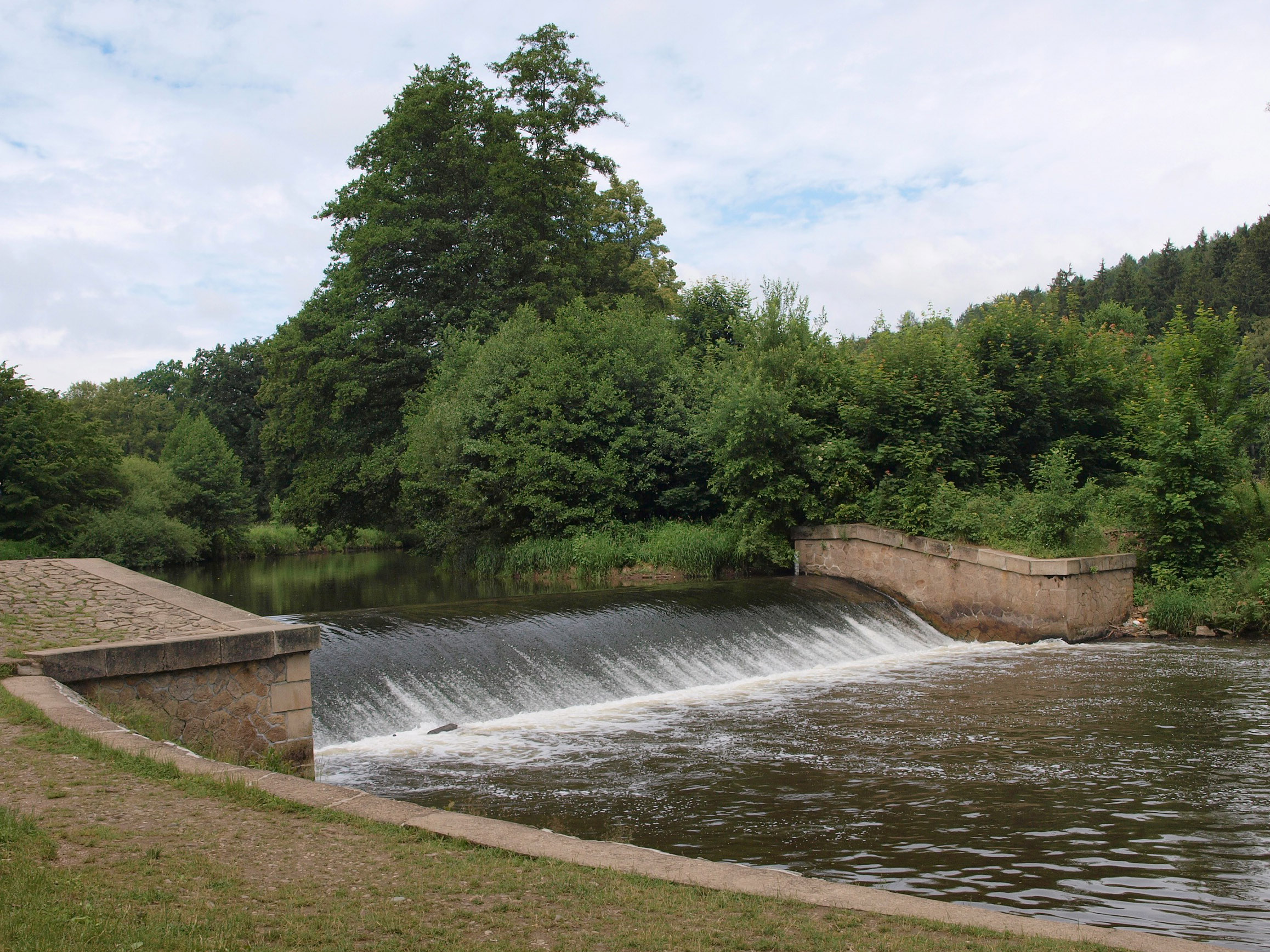
Babiččino údolí, Viktorčin splav (Viktorka's Weir)

The route from Viktorka's Weir to the so-called “Bílý most” (White Bridge) and “Červený most” (Red Bridge) continues through the landscape valley. Opening up beyond the bridges is a view of “Rýzmburský altán” (Rýzmburk Arbour), built above a steep slope in the ruins of a medieval castle of the same name at the end of the 18th century. It gained its present appearance in 1912.

=== Hunting pavilion ===
Standing in the so-called Pheasantry, it was completed 1800 as an Empire building with a large hall in the façade and two adjoining wings. The façade is emphasized by two Doric columns bearing a wide, triangular gable. During the hunts which took place here the gentry were provided with refreshments in the pavilion, tea being served in the course of rides through the park (hence the name "Čajový Pavilion").

== See also ==
- Babička (The Grandmother)
- Czech literature
