= Prince Frederick Augustus of Anhalt-Dessau =

German prince (1799–1864)

Frederick Augustus
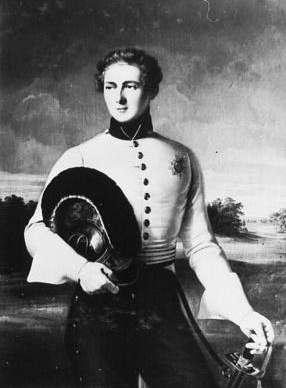
- Portrait of Prince Frederick Augustus as an Imperial Dragoon officer by Johann Heinrich Beck (1823)
- Born: 23 September 1799; Dessau, Anhalt
- Died: 4 December 1864 (aged 65); Dessau, Anhalt
- Spouse: Princess Marie Luise Charlotte of Hesse-Kassel (m. 1832)
- Issue: Adelaide, Duchess of Nassau, Grand Duchess of Luxembourg; Bathildis, Princess William of Schaumburg-Lippe; Princess Hilda
- House: Ascania
- Father: Frederick, Hereditary Prince of Anhalt-Dessau
- Mother: Amalie of Hesse-Homburg

Frederick Augustus of Anhalt-Dessau (German: Friedrich August von Anhalt-Dessau) (23 September 1799 – 4 December 1864), was a German prince of the House of Ascania from the Anhalt-Dessau branch.

== Birth and family ==
Frederick was born in Dessau on 23 September 1799 as the fourth (but third surviving son) of Frederick, Hereditary Prince of Anhalt-Dessau, by his wife Landgravine Amalie of Hesse-Homburg, daughter of Frederick V, Landgrave of Hesse-Homburg.

== Marriage and issue ==
On September 1832, Frederick Augustus married Princess Marie Luise Charlotte of Hesse-Kassel (b. Copenhagen, 9 May 1814 – d. Schloss Hohenburg, 28 July 1895). She was the daughter of Prince William of Hesse-Kassel and Princess Louise Charlotte of Denmark, sister of King Christian VIII of Denmark. Marie was an older sister of the later Queen Louise, wife of King Christian IX of Denmark.

They had three daughters:

1. Adelaide Marie (b. Dessau, 25 December 1833 – d. Königstein Castle, 24 November 1916), married on 23 April 1851 to Adolphe, last Duke of Nassau and first Grand Duke of Luxembourg. The current Grand Duke of Luxembourg, Henri, is her direct descendant.
2. Bathildis Amalgunde (b. Dessau, 29 December 1837 – d. Náchod Castle, Bohemia, 10 February 1902), married on 30 May 1862 to Prince William of Schaumburg-Lippe. Her eldest daughter, Charlotte, was the wife of William II, the last King of Württemberg and, through one of her younger daughters, Adelaide, she was the grandmother of the last head of the Wettin branch of Saxe-Altenburg, George Moritz.
3. Hilda Charlotte (b. Dessau, 13 December 1839 – d. Dessau, 22 December 1926).

== Death ==
Prince Frederick died on 4 December 1864 in Dessau, aged 65. Princess Marie survived him by 30 years and died on 28 July 1895 in Schloss Hohenburg in Lenggries in Bavaria.

He was buried, alongside his wife, in the Marienkirche, Dessau, until WWI, after which their bodies were transferred to Berenhorst crypt in the Friedhof I, Dessau, Germany.
