= George William, Prince of Schaumburg-Lippe =

George William
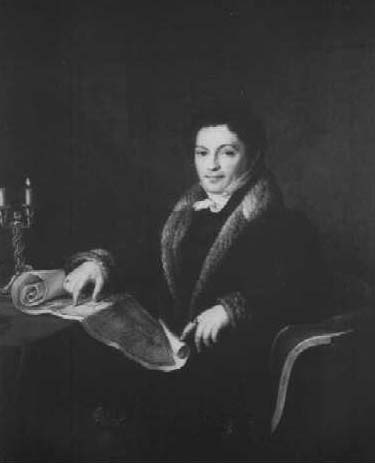
- Portrait of George William

Count, then Prince of Schaumburg-Lippe
- Reign: 13 February 1787 – 21 November 1860
- Predecessor: Philipp II
- Successor: Adolf I
- Born: 20 December 1784; Bückeburg, Schaumburg-Lippe, Holy Roman Empire
- Died: 21 November 1860 (aged 75); Bückeburg, Schaumburg-Lippe, German Confederation
- Spouse: Princess Ida of Waldeck and Pyrmont (m. 1816)
- Issue: Adolf I, Prince of Schaumburg-Lippe; Mathilde; Adelheid, Duchess of Schleswig-Holstein-Sonderburg-Glücksburg; Ernst; Ida; Emma; William; Hermann; Elisabeth
- House: Lippe
- Father: Philipp II, Count of Schaumburg-Lippe
- Mother: Landgravine Juliane of Hesse-Philippsthal

Georg Wilhelm, Prince of Schaumburg-Lippe (20 December 1784 – 21 November 1860) was a Count and later Prince of Schaumburg-Lippe.

== Early life and ancestry ==
He was born in Bückeburg, into the youngest branch of the House of Lippe, the son of Philipp II, Count of Schaumburg-Lippe, and his second wife, Landgravine Juliane of Hesse-Philippsthal.

== Biography ==
He succeeded his father as Count of Schaumburg-Lippe on 13 February 1787, at the age of 2, due to his age, his mother Princess Juliane acted as regent. However William IX, Landgrave of Hessen-Kassel occupied all of Schaumburg-Lippe except for Wilhelmstein, after invading it to enforce his claim to Schaumburg-Lippe based on Princess Juliane's supposed morganatic ancestry. The Imperial Court in Vienna, however, ruled in favor of George William and ordered Landgrave William IX to withdraw, which he did after a two-month occupation.

Schaumburg-Lippe joined the Confederation of the Rhine on 15 December 1807 and was raised to a principality: George William became the first Prince of Schaumburg-Lippe. In 1815, Schaumburg-Lippe joined the German Confederation.

== Marriage and children ==
Georg Wilhelm was married on 23 June 1816 at Arolsen to Princess Ida of Waldeck and Pyrmont, the eldest daughter of George I, Prince of Waldeck and Pyrmont and his wife, Princess Augusta of Schwarzburg-Sondershausen.

The marriage produced nine children:

- Prince Adolf I (1817–1893)
- Princess Mathilde (1818–1891); married 1843 Duke Eugen of Württemberg
- Princess Adelheid (1821–1899); married 1841 Friedrich, Duke of Schleswig-Holstein-Sonderburg-Glücksburg
- Prince Ernst (1822–1831)
- Princess Ida (1824–1894)
- Princess Emma (1827–1828)
- Prince William (1834–1906); married 1862 Princess Bathildis of Anhalt-Dessau
- Prince Hermann (1839–1839)
- Princess Elisabeth (1841–1926); married 1866 (and divorced 1868) Prince Wilhelm of Hanau and Horowitz, a morganatic son of Frederick William, Elector of Hesse.

== Death ==
Georg Wilhelm died on 21 November 1860 at Bückeburg palace and was succeeded as Prince by his son Adolf. His body was buried in a Schaumburg-Lippe family mausoleum in Stadthagen, Schaumburg, Lower Saxony, Germany.

George William, Prince of Schaumburg-Lippe House of Lippe Born: 20 December 1784 Died: 21 November 1860
Regnal titles
Preceded by Philipp II	Count of Schaumburg-Lippe; 1787–1807	Raised to Prince
New title Previously Count	Prince of Schaumburg-Lippe; 1807–1860	Succeeded by Adolf I
