= Princess Helena Adelaide of Schleswig-Holstein-Sonderburg-Glücksburg =

- Princess Harald of Denmark
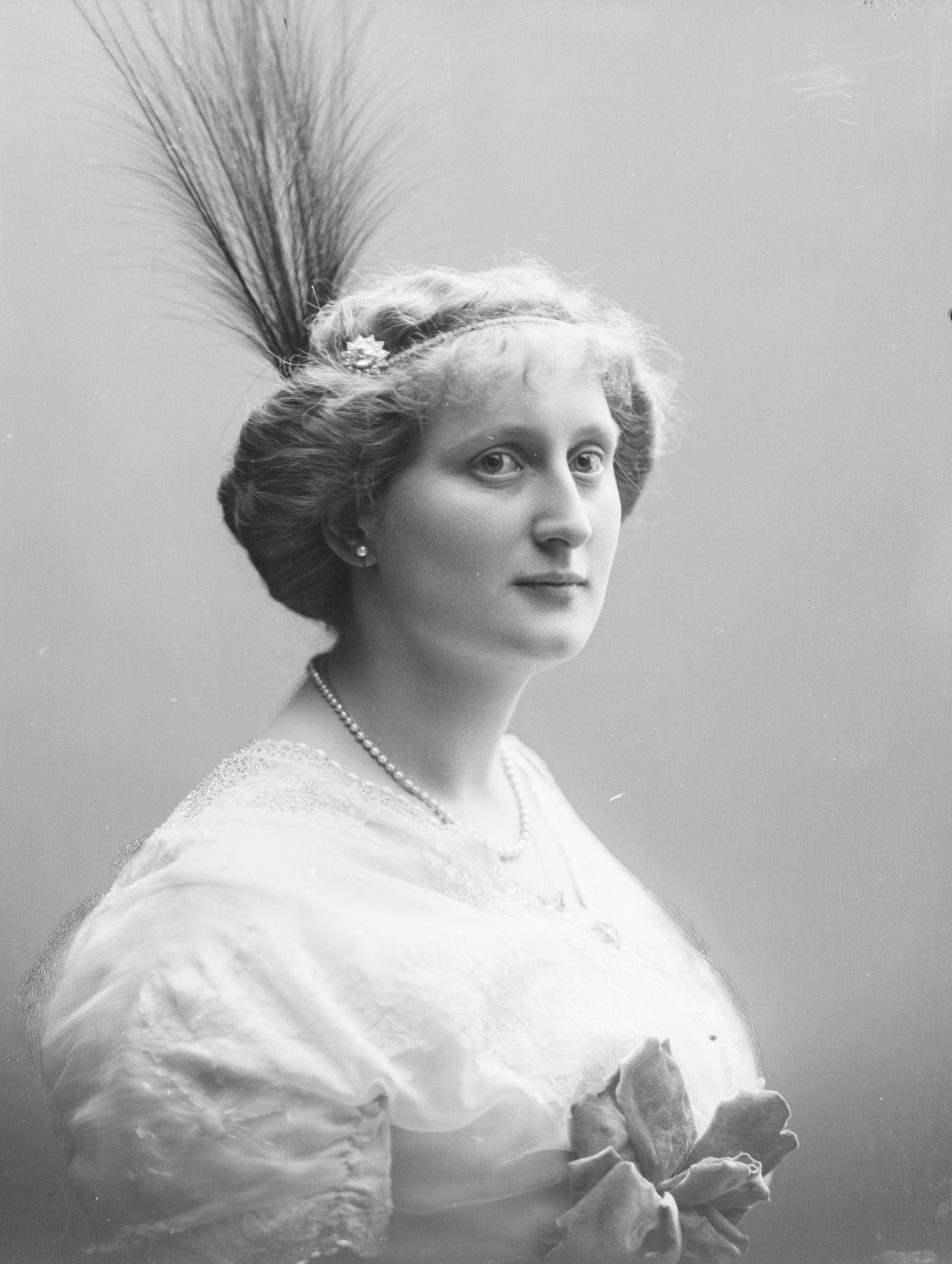
- Helena in 1914.
- Born: 1 June 1888; Grünholz, Province of Schleswig-Holstein, Kingdom of Prussia, German Empire
- Died: 30 June 1962 (aged 74); Hellerup, Denmark
- Spouse: Prince Harald of Denmark (m. 1909; died 1949)
- Issue: Feodora, Princess Christian of Schaumburg-Lippe; Caroline-Mathilde, Hereditary Princess of Denmark; Alexandrine-Louise, Countess Luitpold of Castell-Castell; Prince Gorm; Count Oluf of Rosenborg
Names
- Helena Adelaide Victoria Marie; German: Helene Adelheid Viktoria Marie
- House: Glücksburg
- Father: Friedrich Ferdinand, Duke of Schleswig-Holstein
- Mother: Princess Karoline Mathilde of Schleswig-Holstein-Sonderburg-Augustenburg

Princess Helena Adelaide of Schleswig-Holstein-Sonderburg-Glücksburg (German: Helene Adelheid Viktoria Marie; 1 June 1888 - 30 June 1962) was the third eldest daughter of Friedrich Ferdinand, Duke of Schleswig-Holstein and his wife Princess Karoline Mathilde of Schleswig-Holstein-Sonderburg-Augustenburg. She was a princess of Denmark through her marriage within the House of Schleswig-Holstein-Sonderburg-Glücksburg to Prince Harald of Denmark. Princess Helena was a Nazi sympathiser during World War II and was after the war exiled from Denmark, but eventually allowed to return, where she died.

== Early life ==
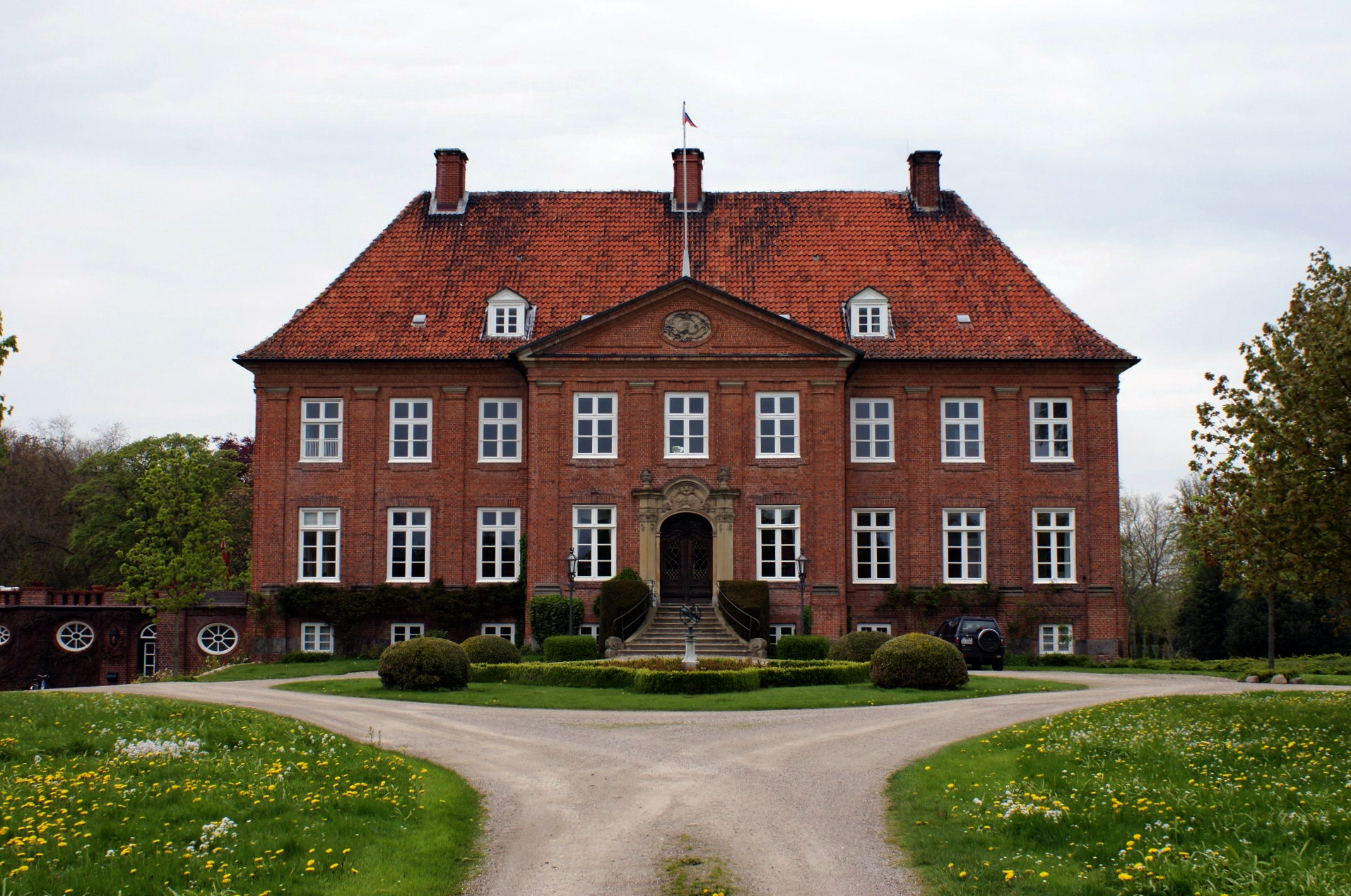
Princess Helena's birthplace, Grünholz Castle, photographed in 2010.

Princess Helena was born 1 June 1888 at Grünholz Castle (Thumby) in Schleswig-Holstein, Prussia, the third eldest daughter of Frederick Ferdinand, Duke of Schleswig-Holstein-Sonderburg-Glücksburg and his wife Princess Karoline Mathilde of Schleswig-Holstein-Sonderburg-Augustenburg. Her mother was sister of Empress Augusta Victoria, making her sister in law of Wilhelm II, German Emperor and granddaughter of Princess Feodora of Leiningen, maternal half-sister of Queen Victoria. Her father was the eldest son of Friedrich, Duke of Schleswig-Holstein-Sonderburg-Glücksburg and a nephew of Christian IX of Denmark. Three years before the birth of Princess Helena, he had succeeded to the headship of the House of Schleswig-Holstein-Sonderburg-Glücksburg and the title of Duke upon the death of his father in 1885.

== Marriage and issue ==
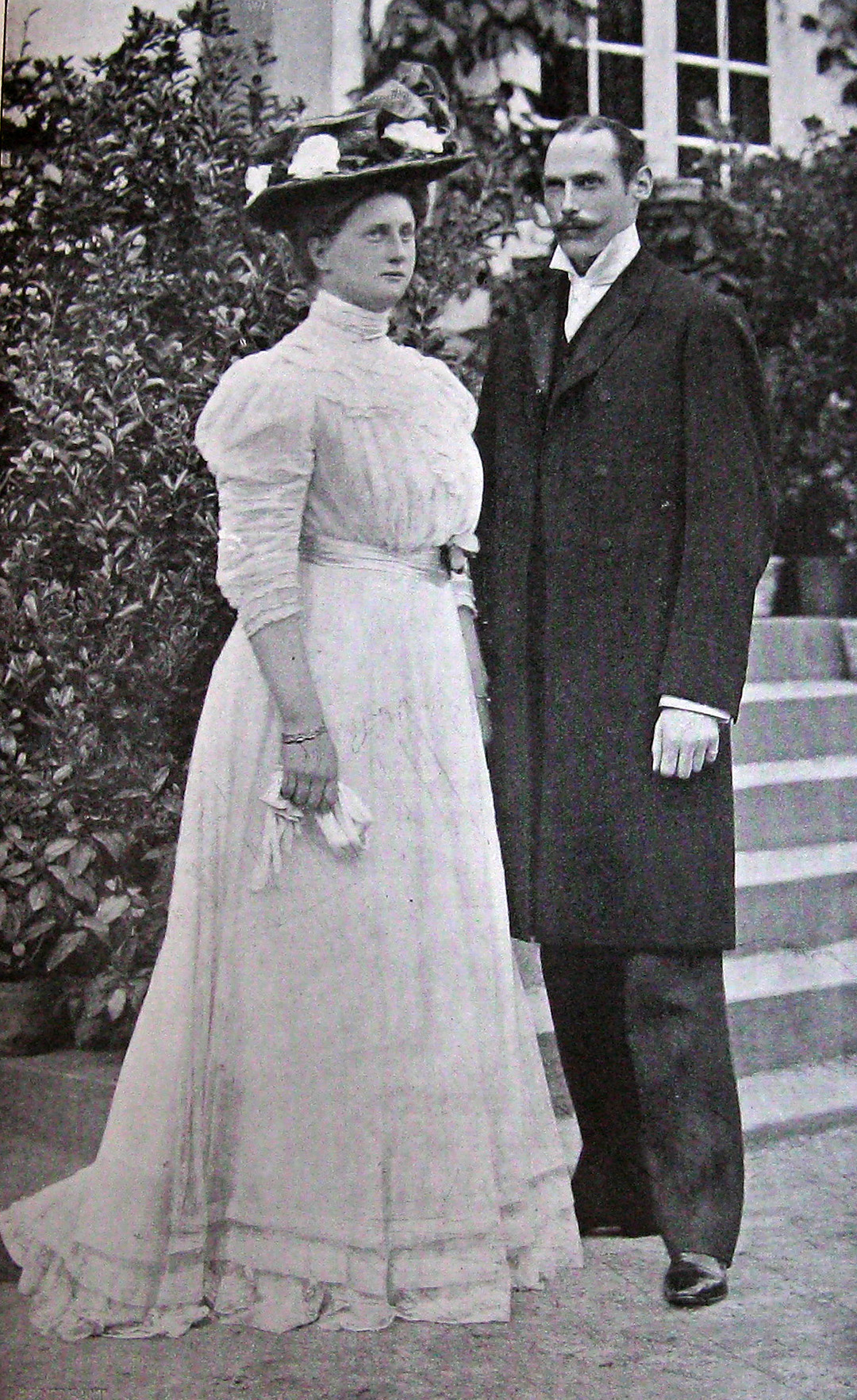
Princess Helena and Prince Harald in 1909

Princess Helena was engaged in 1908, and married Prince Harald of Denmark, fourth child and third son of Frederik VIII of Denmark and his wife Princess Louise of Sweden and Norway on 28 April 1909 at Glücksburg, Schleswig-Holstein, Germany.

After their marriage, Prince Harald and Princess Helena lived at the Jægersborghus country house north of Copenhagen which Prince Harald had purchased in 1907. Their five children were born between 1910 and 1923.

== Married life ==
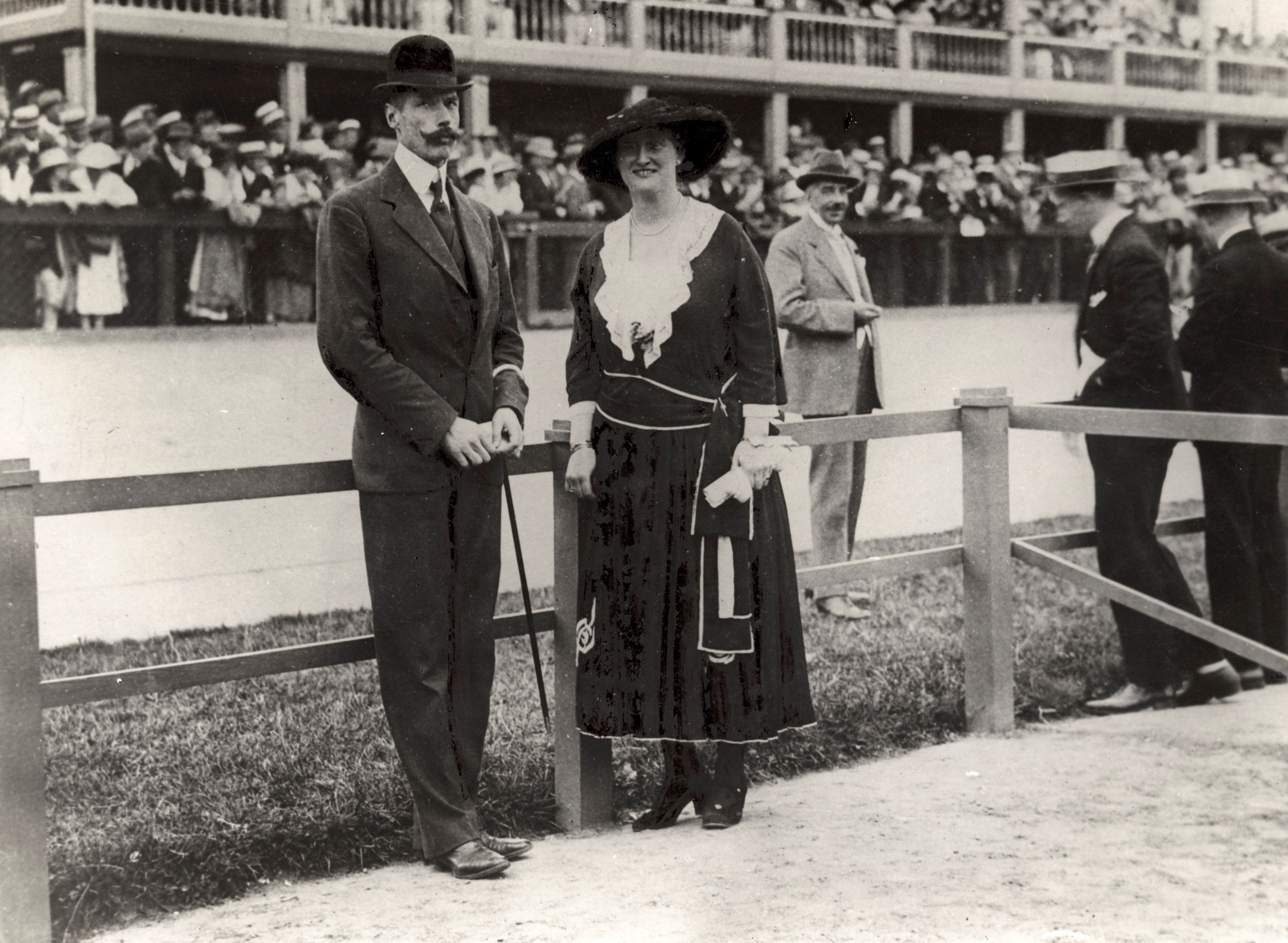
Prince Harald and Princess Helena attending the 1921 world track cycling championships at the Ordrup velodrome in Copenhagen.

The only activity deemed acceptable for a female member of the royal house except representation was charity and, in 1913, Princess Helena started a campaign to found an orphanage in Gentofte. The orphanage, Spædbørnshjemmet Danmark, was finally founded in 1923. After this, she acted as the protector of the orphanage and its funds, which was taken over by her daughter princess Caroline-Mathilde after her. The institution's money was in 1977 used to create the Danmarksfonden, a fund for social and cultural matters.

== World War II ==
Princess Helena became very unpopular during World War II because of her sympathy for the German occupation and the Nazi party after the German occupation of Denmark in 1940. The Danish resistance movement stated that Princess Helena was the only member of the Danish royal house to have betrayed Denmark: she received and entertained Germans in her home, attended parties hosted by the Germans at Gesandtskab and had been introduced to Danish collaborationists by the Danish noblewoman Ebba Lerche. Her actions were so unpopular that, on some occasions, enraged Danes had even broken the windows of her limousine. Because of her professed support for the Germans, she was reportedly not on speaking terms with her sons, who were embarrassed by her behaviour. Even her husband had taken to avoiding the dining room when she was hosting him. One of her own servants, Paul Dall, responsible for setting her table, was a contact of the German Abwehr in Copenhagen, and was after the war judged guilty as a spy.

On 18 January 1942, she participated in the memorial service for an SS officer, C.E. von Schalburg, who had died on the Russian front, a service which the monarch refused to attend. In 1942, Helena made efforts to convince Prince Knud of Denmark to persuade the monarch to allow Nazi members in to the Danish government.

Princess Helena is not considered to have been a regular German agent, but rather an informer and a contact on informal basis. After the war, owing to Princess Helena being a member of the Royal house, she was not brought to trial, as any punishment was at the discretion of the King. He instead exiled her from Denmark on 30 May 1945 and placed under house arrest at the Glücksburg Castle in Germany.

== Last years ==
She was allowed to return to Denmark in 1947, when Prince Harald fell gravely ill. She stayed with her spouse until his death two years later. Prince Harald died on 30 March 1949 in Copenhagen. Princess Helena survived her husband by 13 years and died on 30 June 1962 in Hellerup, Denmark. She was buried at Roskilde Cathedral.

== Issue ==
Helena and Harald had five children:

Name	Birth	Death	Notes
Princess Feodora	3 July 1910	17 March 1975	married her first cousin, Prince Christian of Schaumburg-Lippe and had issue.
Princess Caroline-Mathilde	27 April 1912	12 December 1995	married her first cousin Knud, Hereditary Prince of Denmark and had issue.
Princess Alexandrine-Louise	12 December 1914	26 April 1962	married Count Luitpold of Castell-Castell and had issue.
Prince Gorm	24 February 1919	26 December 1991	Unmarried and without issue.
Prince Oluf	10 March 1923	19 December 1990	Lost his title and became HE Count Oluf of Rosenborg after marrying without consent to Annie Helene Dorrit Puggard-Müller and to Lis Wulff-Juergensen. He has issue.

== Ancestry ==
Ancestors of Princess Helena Adelaide of Schleswig-Holstein-Sonderburg-Glücksburg

8. Friedrich Wilhelm, Duke of Schleswig-Holstein-Sonderburg-Glücksburg
4. Friedrich, Duke of Schleswig-Holstein-Sonderburg-Glücksburg
9. Princess Louise Caroline of Hesse-Kassel
2. Friedrich Ferdinand, Duke of Schleswig-Holstein
10. George William, Prince of Schaumburg-Lippe
5. Princess Adelheid of Schaumburg-Lippe
11. Princess Ida of Waldeck and Pyrmont
1. Princess Helena of Schleswig-Holstein-Sonderburg-Glücksburg
12. Christian August II, Duke of Schleswig-Holstein-Sonderburg-Augustenburg
6. Frederik VIII, Duke of Schleswig-Holstein
13. Countess Louise Sophie Danneskiold-Samsøe
3. Princess Karoline Mathilde of Schleswig-Holstein-Sonderburg-Augustenburg
14. Ernst I, Prince of Hohenlohe-Langenburg
7. Princess Adelheid of Hohenlohe-Langenburg
15. Princess Feodora of Leiningen
