= Louise of Sweden =

Queen of Denmark from 1906 to 1912

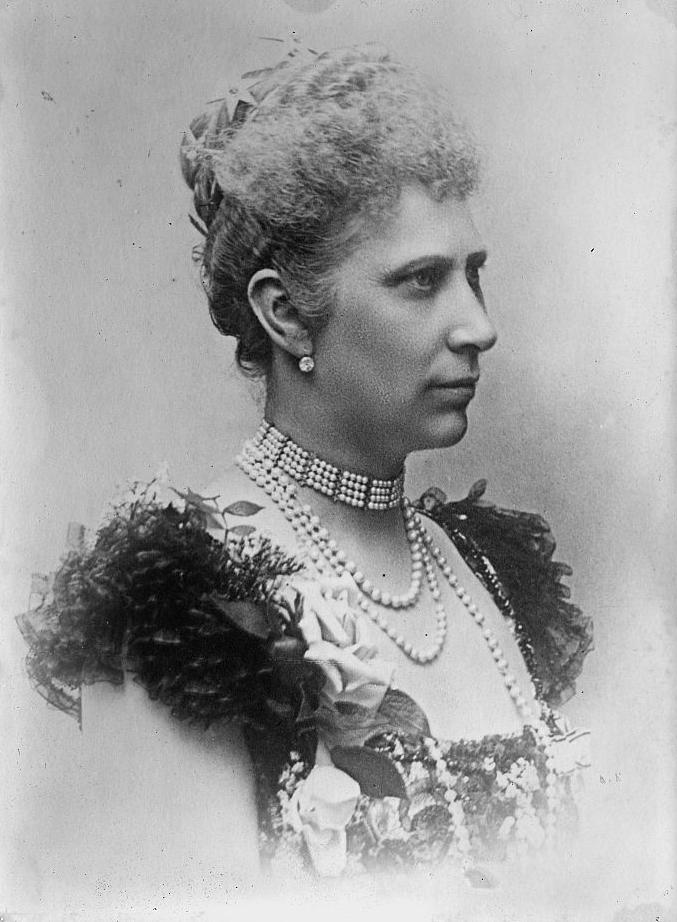
- Queen Louise, c. 1912

Queen consort of Denmark
- Tenure: 29 January 1906 – 14 May 1912
- Born: 31 October 1851; Stockholm Palace, Stockholm, Sweden
- Died: 20 March 1926 (aged 74); Amalienborg Palace, Copenhagen, Denmark
- Burial: 28 March 1926; Roskilde Cathedral
- Spouse: Frederick VIII of Denmark (m. 1869; died 1912)
- Issue: Christian X of Denmark; Haakon VII of Norway; Princess Louise; Prince Harald; Princess Ingeborg, Duchess of Västergötland; Princess Thyra; Prince Gustav; Princess Dagmar
Names
- Swedish: Lovisa Josefina Eugenia; English and Danish: Louise Josephine Eugenie
- House: Bernadotte
- Father: Charles XV of Sweden
- Mother: Louise of the Netherlands
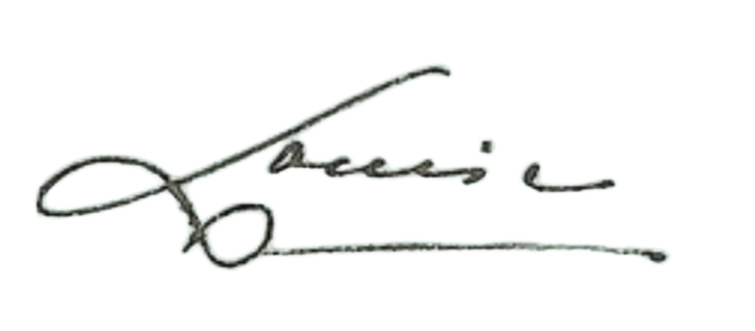
- Signature

Louise of Sweden (Swedish: Lovisa Josefina Eugenia; 31 October 1851 – 20 March 1926) was Queen of Denmark from 1906 until 1912 as the wife of King Frederick VIII.

Born into the House of Bernadotte, Louise was the only surviving child of King Charles XV of Sweden and IV of Norway and his consort, Louise of the Netherlands. Although her father made several attempts to have her recognized as his heir, she was barred from the succession as at the time only males could ascend the throne of Sweden. In 1869, she married the future King Frederick VIII of Denmark, with whom she had eight children. Louise became queen of Denmark in 1906. As queen, she was mainly known for her many charity projects, an interest that she shared with her spouse. She did not care for ceremonial duties and public events, and lived a discreet life dedicated to her children and her interests in art, literature and charity. After a short tenure as queen, she was widowed in 1912.

Louise was the mother of both King Christian X of Denmark and King Haakon VII of Norway.

== Birth and family ==
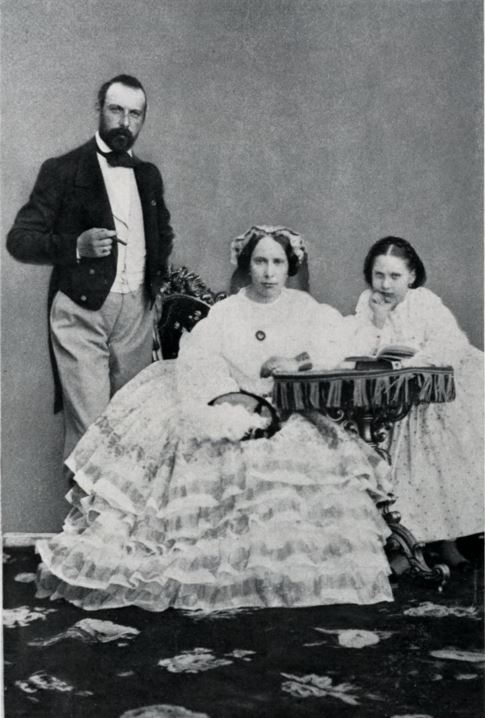
Princess Louise with her parents.

Princess Louise of Sweden and Norway was born on 31 October 1851 at the Royal Palace in Stockholm. She was the first child born to the then Crown Prince Charles of Sweden and Norway and his wife, Princess Louise of the Netherlands. Princess Louise belonged to the Bernadotte dynasty, which had reigned in Sweden since 1818. Its founder, Jean-Baptiste Bernadotte, one of Napoleon Bonaparte's generals, was elected crown prince of Sweden in 1810 and later succeeded the throne as King Charles XIV John in 1818. He married Désirée Clary, who had once been engaged to the French Emperor. Charles XIV's son, Oscar I, had married Josephine of Leuchtenberg, the granddaughter of Napoleon's first wife, the Empress Josephine. King Oscar I and Queen Josephine were Princess Louise's paternal grandparents.

The following year Princess Louise's younger brother, the long-awaited heir to the throne, Prince Carl Oscar, Duke of Södermanland, was born. However, the little prince died in 1854, and Louise became an only child at the age of three. The tragedy became even greater when it became clear that her mother, due to an injury she had sustained during Prince Carl Oscar's birth, was unable to have any more children. The mother is said to have offered Crown Prince Karl a divorce, which he refused. Louise thus remained an only child. This meant that the throne would pass to her father's younger brother Prince Oscar because, although Sweden had previously had female monarchs and female succession, the Swedish Act of Succession of 1810 had abolished female succession, and introduced agnatic succession.

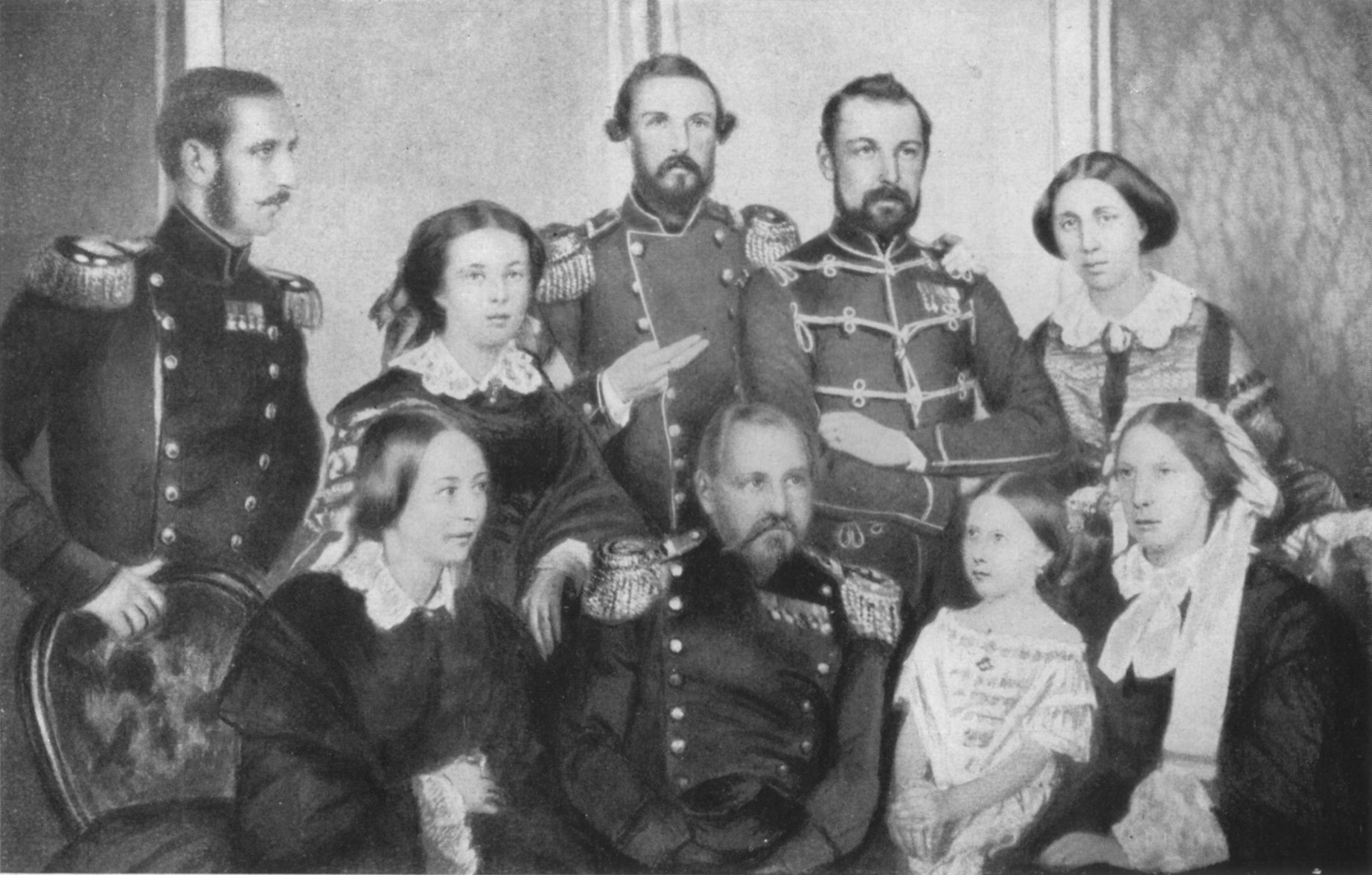
The Swedish royal family in 1857.

On 8 July 1859, when Princess Louise was seven years old, her grandfather King Oscar I died, and her father succeeded him as King of Sweden and Norway under the name of Charles XV. After his accession to the throne, her father made repeated attempts at obtaining a constitutional amendment which would recognize his daughter as heir presumptive to the thrones of Sweden and Norway. These attempts were in vain, however, because after 1858, there was no longer any crisis of succession; Louise's uncle Prince Oscar became the father of several sons, beginning with the birth of the eldest in 1858, and the existence of male relatives in the Bernadotte dynasty rendered action unnecessary. The king could not secure support for a constitutional change which would disinherit his brother and nephews merely to satisfy his desire for his own progeny to ascend the throne; in any case, a daughter could make an advantageous marriage and become the queen of another realm, which is exactly what happened with Louise.

== Childhood and education ==
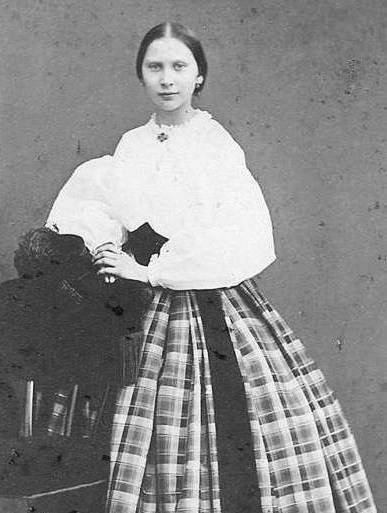
A young princess Louise, photographed in Sweden

While her father often referred to her as "Sessan" (in English: "Sissy", a diminutive form of the title Princess), Louise herself made up the name "Stockholmsrännstensungen" ('Stockholm urchin'), and she often used that term in reference to herself. Her uncle, the future king Oscar II, found it shocking that the word was used for a princess, and tried to curb its use, often admonishing Louise for allowing the word to pass her lips. He was perhaps the only one to try to impose any discipline on her, and Louise is invariably described as a loved and spoiled only child, doted upon by her parents: she is said to have been like her mother in appearance, but like her father in behavior, and she is described as energetic, gregarious, masculine and rather unprepossessing.

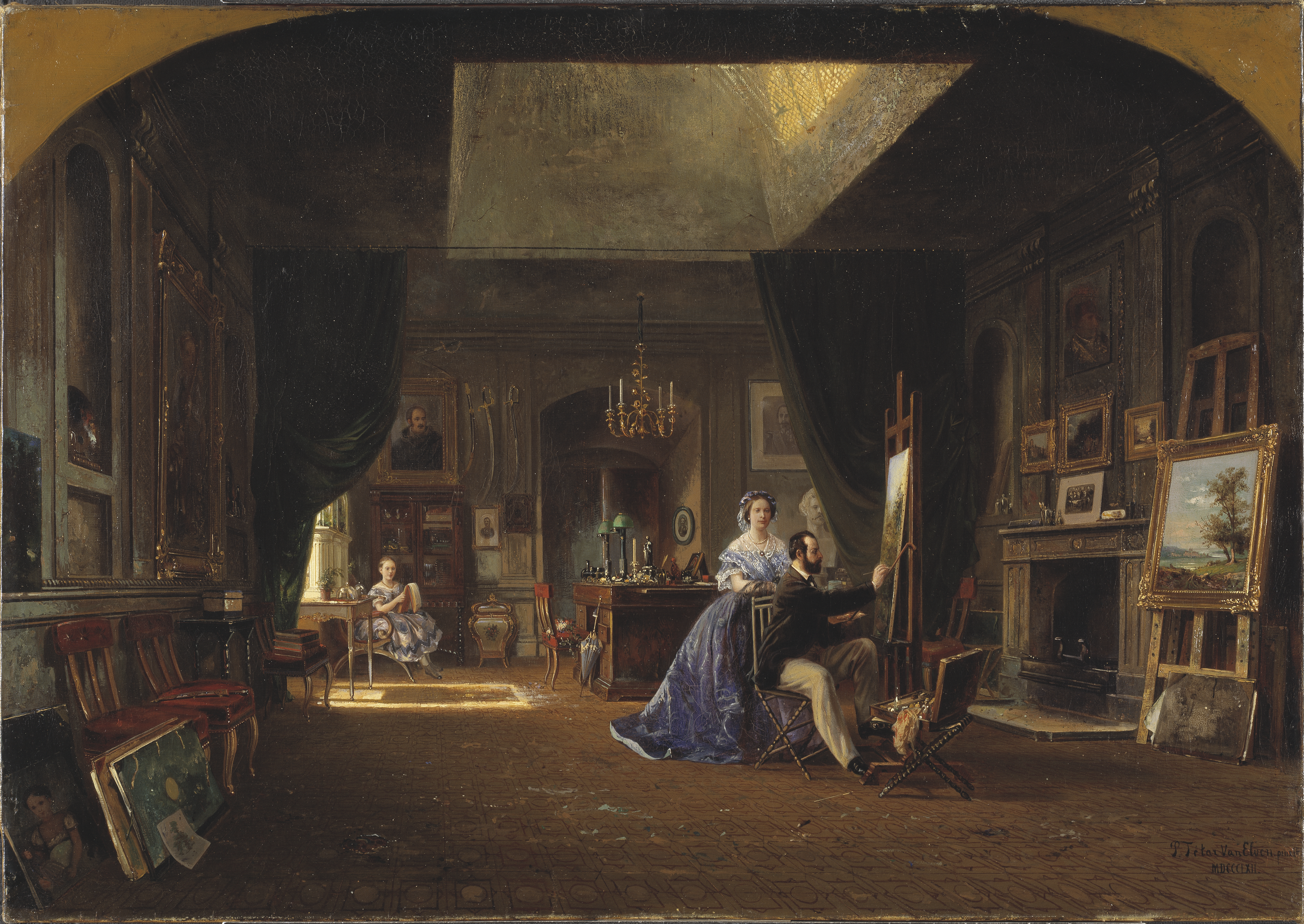
Charles XV's studio. The king is seen sitting at his easel, behind him Queen Lovisa and at the window Princess Lovisa. Pierre Tetar van Elven (1862).

Louise was the center of society already as a child in Stockholm, where children's balls were arranged for her at the Royal Palace in Stockholm, which were considered as the most important part of the society children's social life and attended by among others her male cousins. Her academic education was provided by her governess Hilda Elfving. In 1862, she and her mother became students of Nancy Edberg, the pioneer of swimming for women. The art of swimming was initially not regarded as being entirely proper for women, but when the Queen and her daughter supported it by attending the lessons, swimming was quickly made fashionable and became accepted for women.

== Engagement and marriage ==
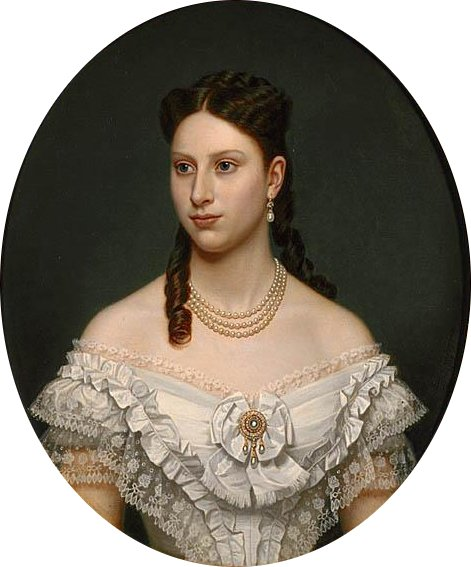
Portrait of Princess Louise by Amalia Lindegren.

Louise became the subject of speculations regarding her marriage early on. The most popular candidate was Crown Prince Frederik of Denmark (1843–1912), the eldest son and child of King Christian IX and Queen Louise of Denmark. This alliance was considered desirable for several reasons. Despite the period's widespread Scandinavism, an ideology that supported a close degree of cooperation among the Scandinavian countries, the relation between the royal houses of Sweden-Norway and Denmark was very tense at this time. Upon the death of the childless King Frederick VII of Denmark in 1863, there had been support for having Charles XV or his brother Prince Oscar of Sweden placed on the Danish throne instead of Christian IX. In Denmark, there was also disappointment over the fact that Sweden, despite the current Scandinavism, had not supported Denmark against Prussia during the Danish-Prussian War in 1864. After 1864, Sweden-Norway and Denmark started to discuss plans to create a form of symbolic reconciliation between the two nations by arranging a marriage between Princess Louise and Crown Prince Frederick.

Still, both parties had reservations about the proposed alliance. Charles XV was critical toward Christian IX, whose personal qualities he doubted, but he nevertheless wanted to see his daughter make an advantageous marriage and become the queen of Denmark. Also the Danish royal family had reservations about the alliance, as Princess Lovisa was no beauty, and her future mother-in-law, Queen Louise, feared that her personality did not fit into the Danish royal family. However, after the recent war with Germany, the marriage was preferred above a marriage to a German princess, which would have been the likely alternative.

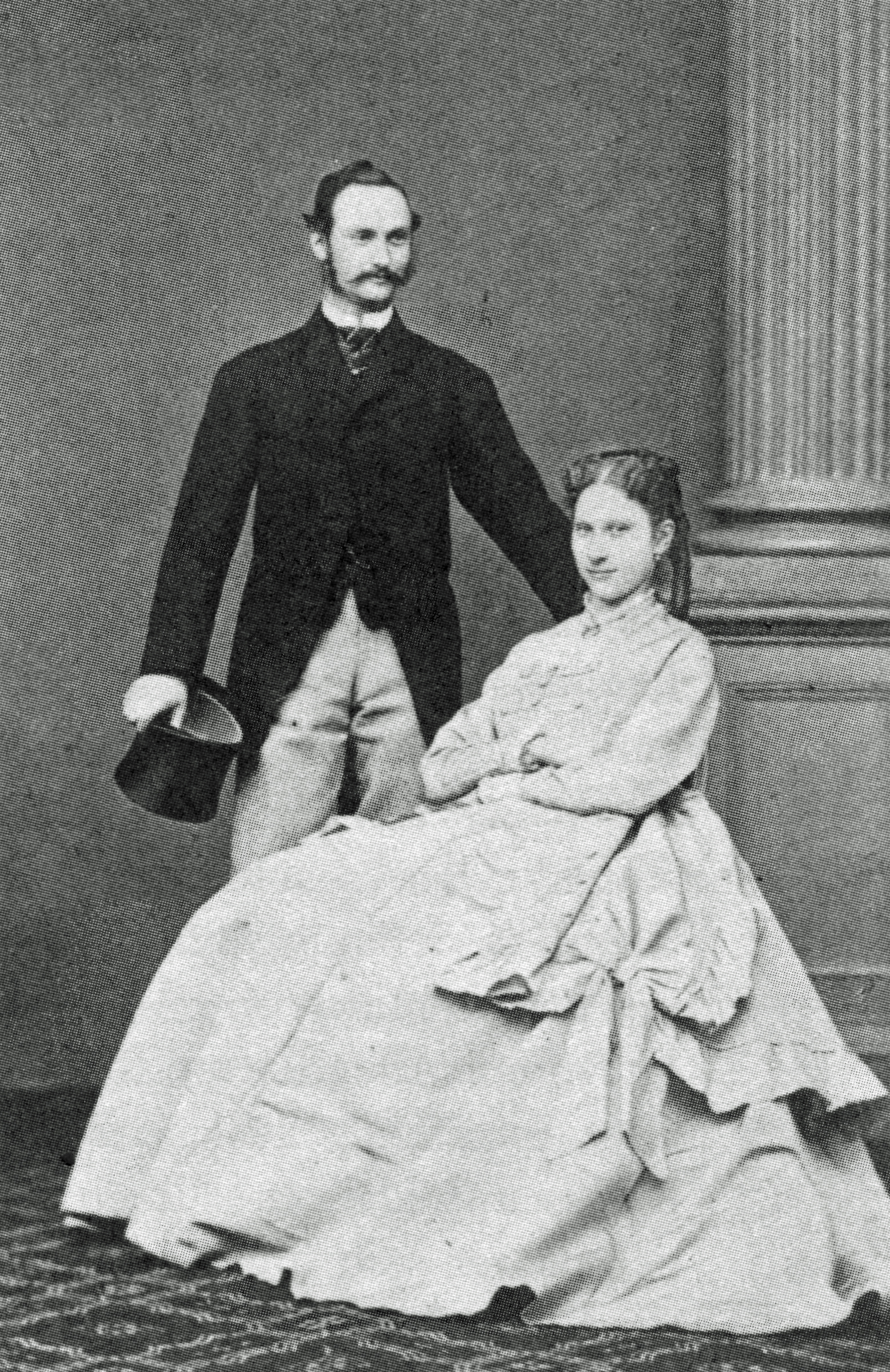
Crown Prince Frederick and Princess Louise.

Louise and Frederick had been introduced to each other the first time in 1862, when the Princess was eleven and the Prince nineteen years old. However, Charles XV did not wish to force his beloved daughter into an arranged marriage, and therefore left the final decision entirely to her own taste. On 14 April 1868, a meeting was arranged between Louise and Frederick at Bäckaskog Castle in Scania. As the matter was dependent upon whether Louise would like Frederick or not, the guests had not been informed about the purpose of the meeting. Except for Frederick, only the Danish King was present from the Danish royal family. Upon meeting each other, both were apparently pleased, and Louise agreed to the marriage. The couple were engaged on 15 June 1868 at Bäckaskog Castle.

During the engagement in the winter of 1868–1869, Louise learned the Danish language and studied Danish literature, culture, and history under the Norwegian poet and art historian Lorentz Dietrichson. The young couple were married on 28 July 1869 in the chapel of the Royal Palace in Stockholm by the Archbishop of Uppsala Henrik Reuterdahl. The wedding was celebrated with great pomp in Sweden. The dowry of the Princess had entirely been made in Sweden. The marriage was welcomed by all three countries as a symbol of the new Scandinavism. Louise was the first Swedish princess to be married into the Danish royal house since Ingeborg Magnusdotter of Sweden in the Middle Ages. Princess Lovisa's wedding was also the first time a Swedish princess had been married off since Princess Ulrika Eleonora's wedding to Frederick I of Hesse in 1715, and Lovisa was thus the first princess from the House of Bernadotte to marry.

== Crown Princess of Denmark ==
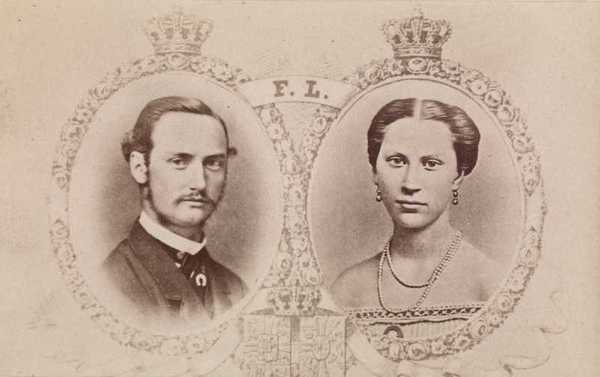
Crown Prince Frederick and Crown Princess Louise.

On 10 August 1869, the newlyweds made their entrance into Copenhagen, where they received a warm welcome. In Denmark, Louise became known as Louise rather than Lovisa. As their residence, the couple was awarded Frederik VIII's Palace, an 18th-century palace which forms part of the Amalienborg Palace complex in central Copenhagen. As their country residence they received Charlottenlund Palace, located on the shores of Øresund Strait 10 kilometers north of Copenhagen. Here they had a refuge far away from court life at Amalienborg and here several of their children were born. Frederick and Louise had eight children between 1870 and 1890: Prince Christian (the later King Christian X of Denmark), Prince Charles (the later King Haakon VII of Norway), Princess Louise, Prince Harald, Princess Ingeborg, Princess Thyra, Prince Gustav and Princess Dagmar. Due to the many children, Charlottenlund Palace was rebuilt to accommodate the large family, and in 1880-81 the palace was expanded with a dome and two side wings.

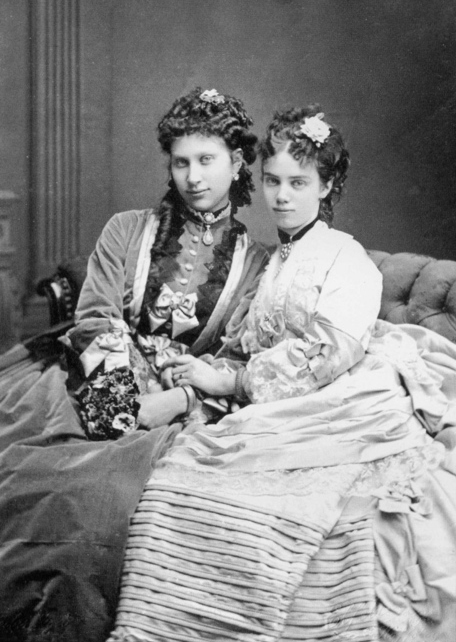
Louise with her sister-in-law Princess Thyra of Denmark.

Louise had a difficult time during her long period as Crown Princess of Denmark, although she became very popular with the public. She was considered intelligent with an ability to act popularly and effortlessly at official functions, where she was described as majestic and impressive. However, she became unpopular within the Danish court and royal family, and the marriage did not result in the desired improvement of the relationship between the Danish and Swedish royal houses. On the contrary, Louise experienced ostracism within the royal family, which was dominated by her mother-in-law, Queen Louise. She was not liked by her mother-in-law and sisters-in-law, and her husband was too timid to give her any support against his mother and sisters. Only with her youngest sister-in-law, Princess Thyra, did she have a good relationship.

Louise's personality and frank nature did not fit in with the Danish royal court, where her cheeky straightforwardness could provoke consternation. On one occasion, when her mother-in-law saw her dressed in a Parisian evening gown and disapprovingly ordered her to change her hair style, Louise answered in the same informal way as she was used to in Sweden: “Take it easy, Pedersen!”. This incident caused Queen Louise to order her and Frederick to leave the country for three months. Crown Princess Louise told Swedish visitor Fritz von Dardel that her mother-in-law tried to place her in the shadows even in ceremonial situations when her presence was required: on one occasion, the Queen had turned down a request from Uppsala University students to sing for the Crown Princess. When Dardel asked for the reason, Louise replied: "Out of jealousy, of course".

The family lived a discreet life at Amalienborg Palace during the winter and Charlottenlund Palace during the summer. During the first years of her marriage, Louise often visited Sweden. She was present at the death of her mother in March 1871. At that time, she was given comfort by her uncle's spouse, Sophie of Nassau, who became her confidante and personal friend. During the summers at Charlottenlund Palace by Öresund, Louise was able to visit her Swedish family at their summer residence Sofiero Palace on the other side of Öresund and receive visits from them, which was described as a relief and comfort for her. However, her mother-in-law disliked the Swedish royal family and insisted that she be informed and asked for permission first.

The Royal family on an excursion. From left Crown Prince Frederik, a coachman, Crown Princess Lovisa, a coachman, Duchess Thyra of Cumberland and Queen Louise. Painting by Otto Bache (1879).

Frederick's lifestyle and adultery damaged his popularity and pained Louise. In 1879, she visited her aunt, Queen Sophia of Sweden in Stockholm to ask for her advice; she was at this point described as distraught. Queen Sophia then introduced her to Lord Radstock and Gustaf Emanuel Beskow. From this point on, Louise reportedly found comfort in religion. She learned Greek, engaged in Bible studies and met Lord Radstock in Copenhagen in 1884. She made friends with the Danish lady-in-waiting Wanda Oxholm, with whom she studied the Bible. She was also interested in handcrafts such as leatherwork and painting.

Louise was described as a strict but caring parent, who gave her children a childhood dominated by religion and duty. Because of her inheritance from her maternal grandparents, the family lived well. It had long been known that she wished to see her daughter married back into the Swedish royal house, which happened when her daughter Princess Ingeborg married Prince Carl, Duke of Västergötland in 1897.

As Crown Princess, Louise was active in charitable and religion activities: she founded several charity organisations, among them the home «Bethania» and the «Kronprinsesse L.s Asyl» (Asylum of Crown Princess Louise), and formed a lifelong interest in The Church Association for the Inner Mission in Denmark. She is described as intelligent, with an ability to be natural, easy and friendly at representational occasions, and was seen as dignified and impressive. In 1875, she received her aunt and uncle, the King and Queen of Sweden, at their official visit to Denmark.

In 1905, Norway became independent from Sweden with Danish support, which caused tension between Denmark and Sweden, and she was saddened when this made it difficult for her to visit Sweden.

Constitutionally, Louise was unable to inherit the thrones of Sweden and Norway. Her father Charles XV & IV was succeeded by his brother Oscar II. By a twist of fate, Louise's son, Prince Carl, did in fact eventually become King of Norway. He was elected to succeed her uncle to the Norwegian throne as a result of Norway's independence from Sweden in 1905.

== Queen of Denmark and Queen Mother ==
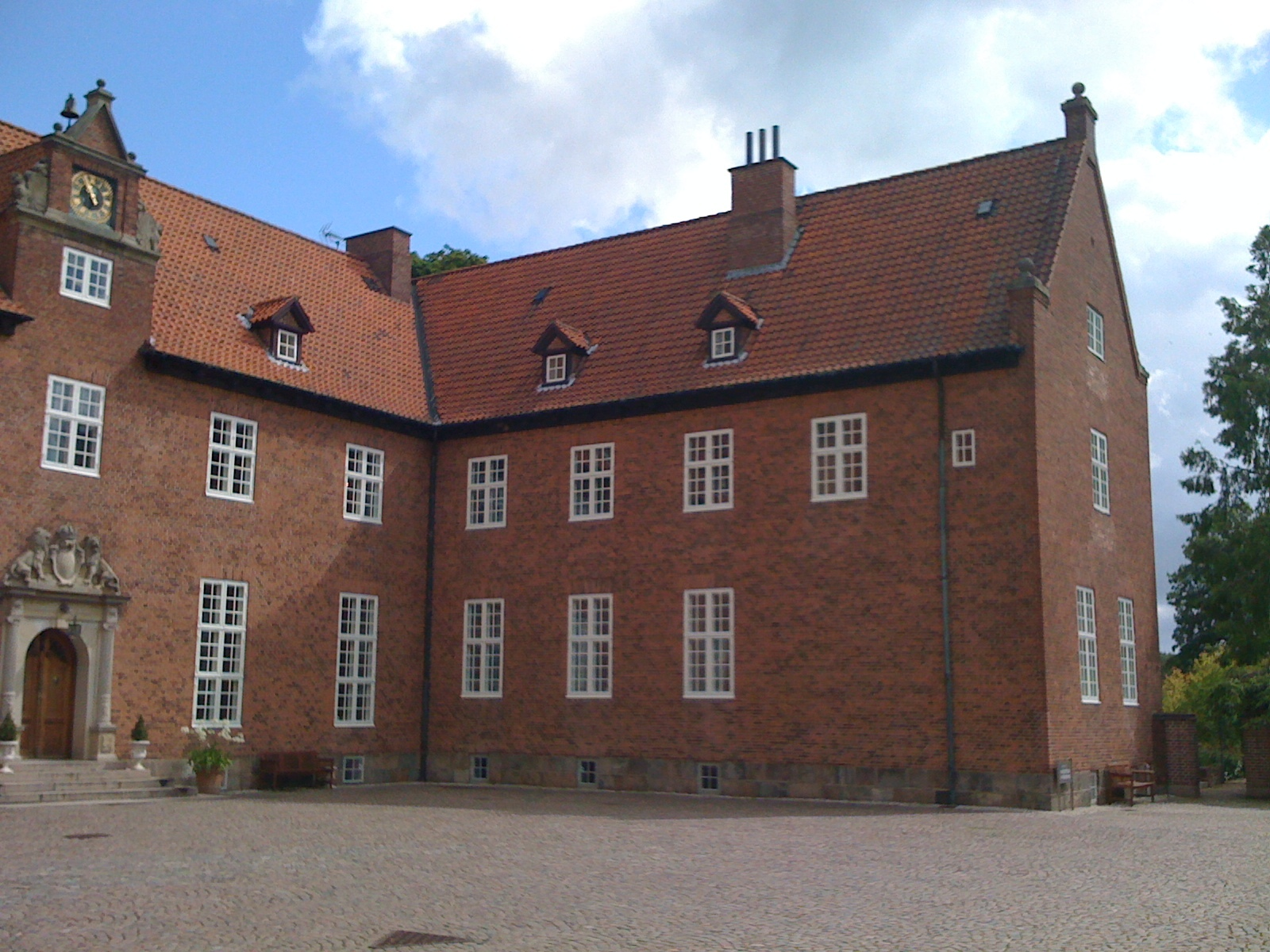
Egelund-

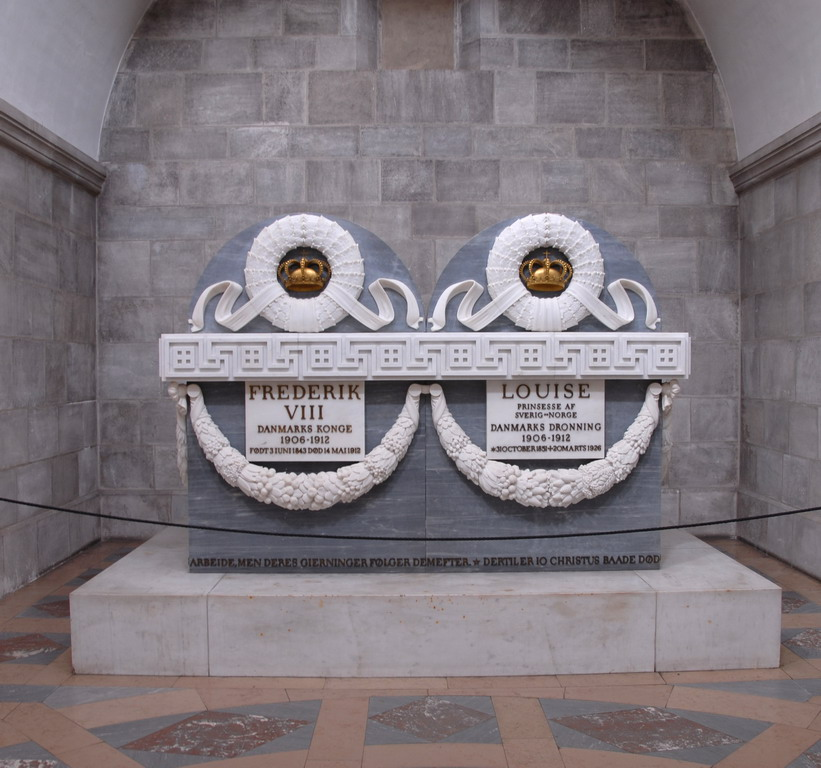
Louise's and Frederik's grave at Roskilde.

Louise became Queen of Denmark in 1906. As Queen, she was mainly known for her many charity projects, an interest that she shared with her spouse. She did not care for ceremonial duties and public events, and lived a discreet life dedicated to her children and her interests in art, literature and charity.

Louise was widowed in 1912. Her eldest son Christian X of Denmark became the new king of Denmark. She was the last widow of a Danish monarch to officially use the title of queen dowager. From 1915 to 1917 she built herself Egelund House between Hillerød and Fredensborg where she lived for the rest of her life. Queen Louise died at Amalienborg Palace in Copenhagen in 1926 and is interred next to her husband in Roskilde Cathedral.

== Legacy ==
Queen Louise was the 862nd Dame of the Order of Queen Maria Luisa. Queen Louise Land in Northeast Greenland was named in her honour.

== Honours and arms ==
=== Honours ===
==== Danish honours ====
- Denmark:
  - Commemorative Medal for the Golden Wedding of King Christian IX and Queen Louise, 1892
  - Insignia of the Order of the Elephant, 31 October 1906

==== Foreign honours ====
- Kingdom of Portugal: Dame of the Order of Queen Saint Isabel
- Kingdom of Prussia: Dame of the Order of Louise, 1st Division
- Russian Empire: Dame Grand Cross of the Order of St. Catherine
- Spain: Dame of the Order of Queen Maria Luisa, 21 January 1886

=== Arms ===
Marital arms of Queen Louise of Denmark

== Issue ==
Name	Birth	Death	Spouse	Children
Christian X of Denmark	26 September 1870	20 April 1947	Duchess Alexandrine of Mecklenburg-Schwerin	Frederik IX of Denmark; Knud, Hereditary Prince of Denmark
Haakon VII of Norway	3 August 1872	21 September 1957	Princess Maud of Wales	Olav V of Norway
Princess Louise of Denmark	17 February 1875	4 April 1906	Prince Frederick of Schaumburg-Lippe	Marie Louise, Princess Friedrich Sigismund of Prussia; Prince Christian of Schaumburg-Lippe; Stephanie, Princess of Bentheim and Steinfurt
Prince Harald of Denmark	8 October 1876	30 March 1949	Princess Helena Adelaide of Schleswig-Holstein-Sonderburg-Glücksburg	Feodora, Princess Christian of Schaumburg-Lippe; Caroline-Mathilde, Hereditary Princess of Denmark; Alexandrine-Louise, Countess Luitpold of Castell-Castell; Prince Gorm of Denmark; Count Oluf of Rosenborg
Princess Ingeborg of Denmark	2 August 1878	12 March 1958	Prince Carl, Duke of Västergötland	Margaretha, Princess Axel of Denmark; Märtha Louise, Crown Princess of Norway; Astrid, Queen of the Belgians; Prince Carl Bernadotte
Princess Thyra of Denmark	14 March 1880	2 November 1945	unmarried	none
Prince Gustav of Denmark	4 March 1887	5 October 1944	unmarried	none
Princess Dagmar of Denmark	23 May 1890	11 October 1961	Jørgen Castenskiold	Carl Castenskiold; Christian Castenskiold; Jørgen Castenskiold; Dagmar Castenskiold; Christian Frederik Castenskiold

== Ancestry ==
Ancestors of Louise of Sweden

8. Charles XIV John of Sweden
4. Oscar I of Sweden
9. Désirée Clary
2. Charles XV of Sweden
10. Eugène de Beauharnais, 1st Duke of Leuchtenberg
5. Princess Joséphine of Leuchtenberg
11. Princess Augusta of Bavaria
1. Louise of Sweden
12. William I of the Netherlands
6. Prince Frederick of the Netherlands
13. Princess Wilhelmine of Prussia
3. Princess Louise of the Netherlands
14. Frederick William III of Prussia
7. Princess Louise of Prussia
15. Duchess Louise of Mecklenburg-Strelitz

Louise of Sweden House of Bernadotte Born: 31 October 1851 Died: 20 March 1926
Danish royalty
Vacant Title last held by Louise of Hesse-Kassel	Queen consort of Denmark; 1906–1912	Succeeded by Alexandrine of Mecklenburg-Schwerin
