= Frederick VIII of Denmark =

King of Denmark from 1906 to 1912

Frederick VIII
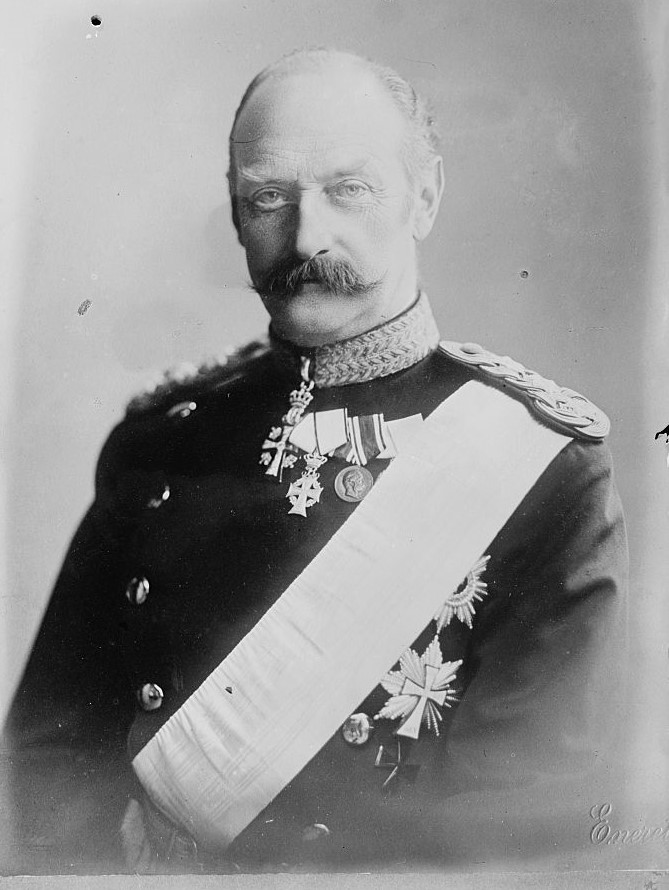
- Formal portrait, 1909

King of Denmark
- Reign: 29 January 1906 – 14 May 1912
- Predecessor: Christian IX
- Successor: Christian X
- Born: Prince Christian Frederik Vilhelm Carl of Schleswig-Holstein-Sonderburg-Glücksburg; 3 June 1843; Yellow Palace, Copenhagen, Denmark
- Died: 14 May 1912 (aged 68); Hamburg, German Empire
- Burial: 24 May 1912; Roskilde Cathedral
- Spouse: Louise of Sweden (m. 1869)
- Issue: Christian X of Denmark; Haakon VII of Norway; Princess Louise; Prince Harald; Princess Ingeborg, Duchess of Västergötland; Princess Thyra; Prince Gustav; Princess Dagmar
- House: Glücksburg
- Father: Christian IX
- Mother: Louise of Hesse-Kassel

Frederick VIII (Danish: Christian Frederik Vilhelm Carl; 3 June 1843 – 14 May 1912) was King of Denmark from 29 January 1906 until his death in 1912.

As the eldest son of King Christian IX, nicknamed "the father-in-law of Europe" and grandfather of Europe, Frederick was related to royalty throughout Europe. He was heir apparent to the Danish throne and served as crown prince for more than 42 years. During the long reign of his father, he was largely excluded from influence and political power.

Upon his father's death in 1906, he acceded to the throne at the advanced age of 62. In many ways, Frederick VIII was a liberal monarch who was much more favorable to the new parliamentary system introduced in 1901 than his father had been, being reform-minded and democratically inclined. Due to his late accession to the throne, however, Frederick's reign would last only six years, throughout which he was plagued by ill health.

Frederick VIII was married to Louise of Sweden, with whom he had eight children. Their eldest son succeeded his father as Christian X, while their second son, Carl, ascended the Norwegian throne as Haakon VII in 1905.

== Early life ==
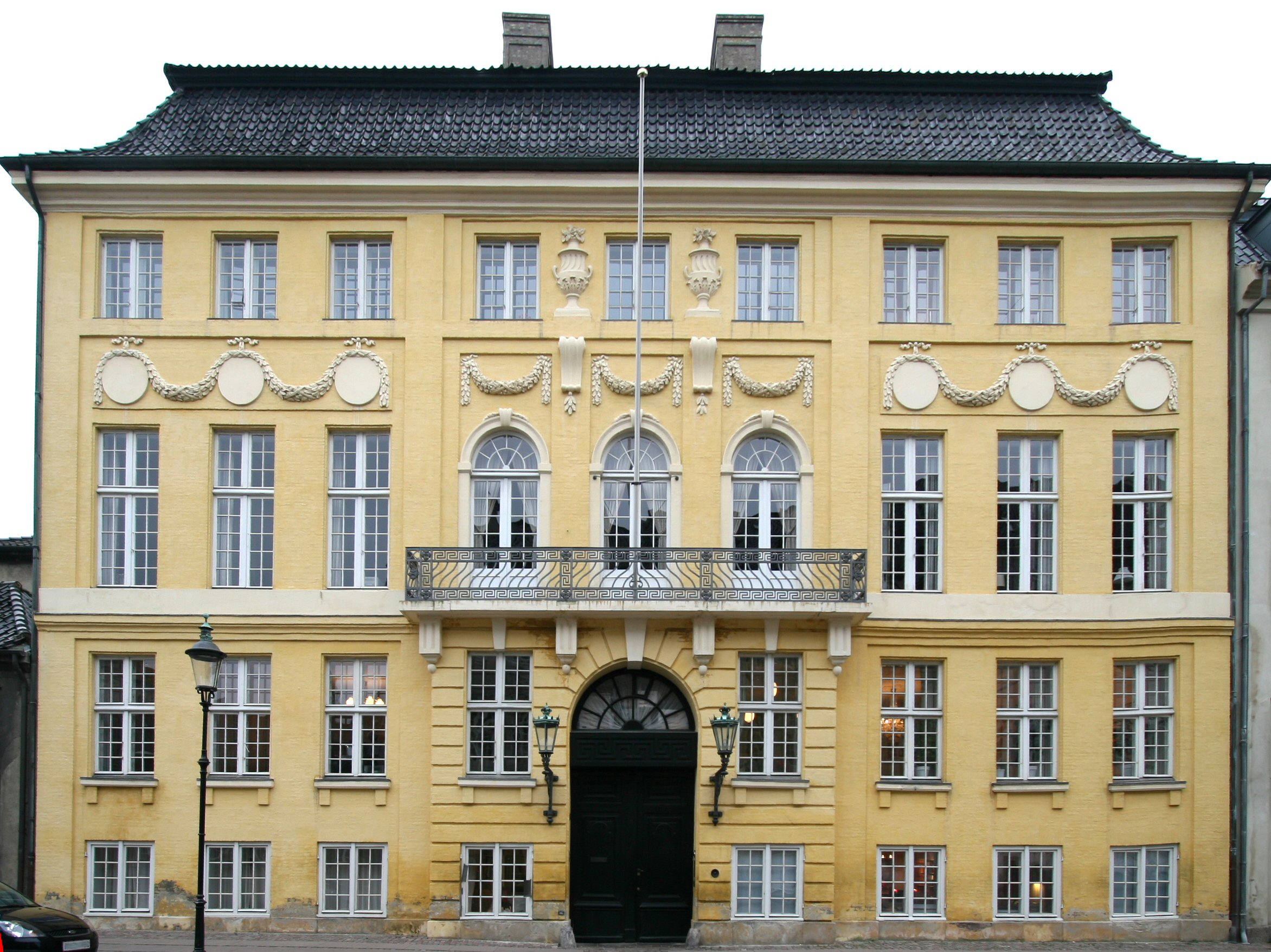
Frederick's birthplace, the Yellow Palace in Copenhagen

Prince Frederick was born on 3 June 1843 in the Yellow Palace, an 18th-century town house at 18 Amaliegade, immediately adjacent to the Amalienborg Palace complex, the principal residence of the Danish royal family in the district of Frederiksstaden in central Copenhagen. He was the eldest child of Prince Christian of Schleswig-Holstein-Sonderburg-Glücksburg and Princess Louise of Hesse-Kassel-Rumpenheim. His father's family was a cadet branch of the Danish royal House of Oldenburg, which was descended from Christian III and which had ruled as non-sovereign dukes in Schleswig-Holstein for eight generations. He was baptised on 22 June with the names Christian Frederik Vilhelm Carl, and was known as Prince Frederick. To the family he was known as Fredy throughout his life.

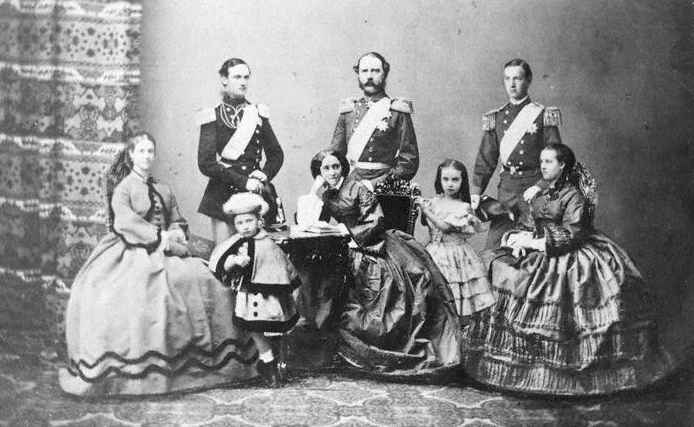
Christian IX of Denmark with his wife and their six children, 1862. Left to right: Dagmar, Frederick, Valdemar, Christian IX, Queen Louise, Thyra, William and Alexandra.

He had five younger siblings: Alexandra (1844–1925), William (1845–1913), Dagmar (1847–1928), Thyra (1853–1933) and Valdemar (1858–1939). Although they were of royal blood, (Note: His parents were both great-grandchildren of Frederick V of Denmark and great-great-grandchildren of King George II of Great Britain.) the family lived a comparatively normal life. They did not possess great wealth; their father's income from an army commission was about £800 per year and their house was a rent-free grace and favour property. Occasionally, Hans Christian Andersen was invited to call and tell the children stories before bedtime. He would also get teased on at school because of his German accent.

In 1853, it was clear that the main line of the Oldenburg dynasty would become extinct with King Frederick VII, who was elderly and childless. Frederick's mother was very close to the succession, as she was a niece of the previous Oldenburg king, Christian VIII, through his sister. With the other heirs from the House of Hesse-Kassel having renounced their claims to the Danish throne in favour of Louise, who in turn relinquished her own claim, his father was eventually chosen as the heir presumptive. Accordingly, Frederick was created a Prince of Denmark.

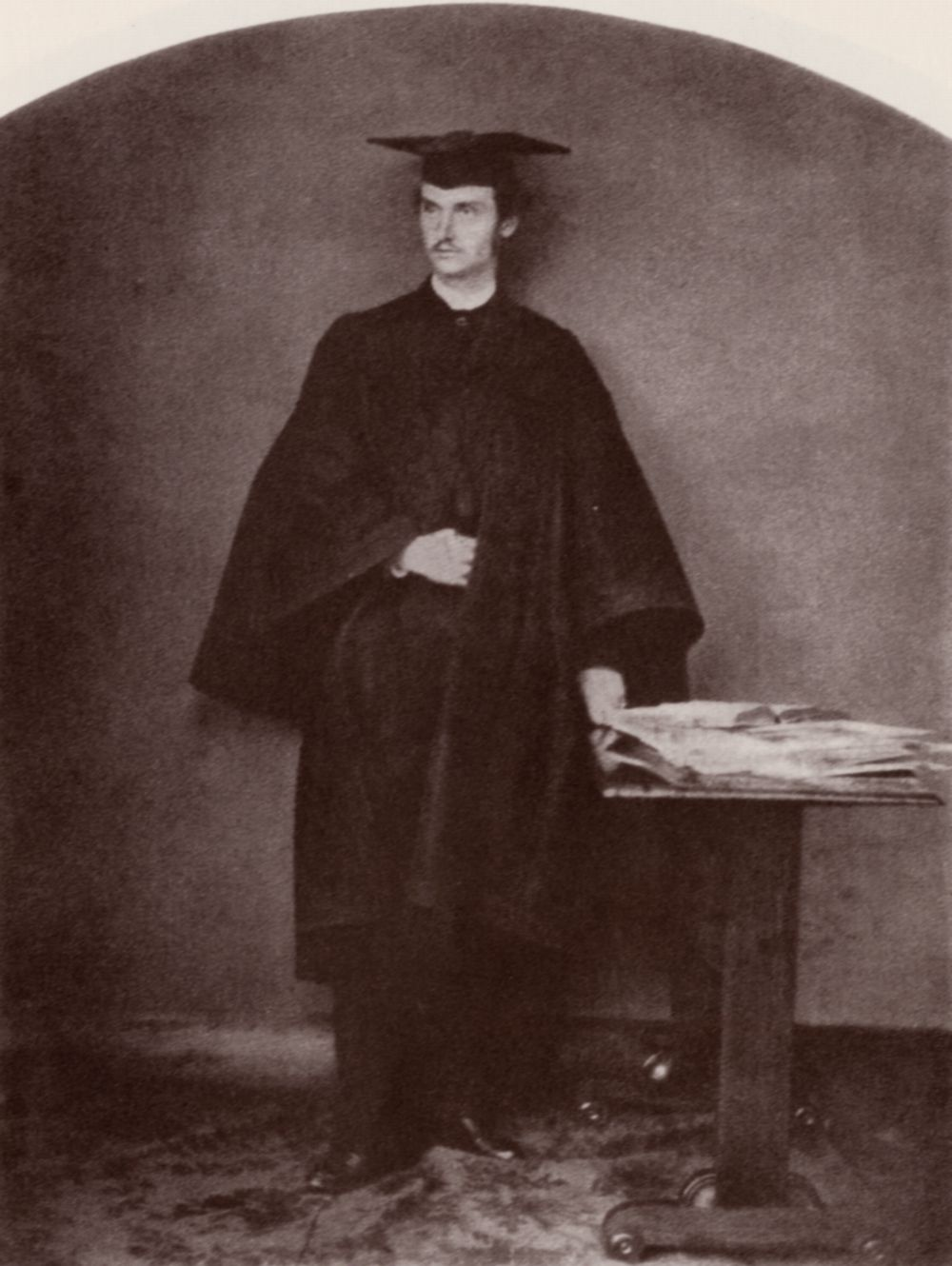
Frederick photographed by Lewis Caroll in 1863 during his stay in Oxford.

On 19 October 1860, he was confirmed together with his sister Princess Alexandra in the chapel of Christiansborg Palace. After his confirmation, Prince Frederick was given an extensive military education, pursuing a career in the Royal Danish Navy alongside his brother Valdemar. In 1863, Frederick was sent to study political science at the University of Oxford, but returned to Denmark upon his father becoming king in November that year. As heir apparent to the throne, he was given a seat in the State Council and subsequently assisted his father in the duties of government. In 1864, he formally took part in the Second Schleswig War against Prussia and Austria.

The crown prince was a member of the Danish Order of Freemasons, serving as its Grand Master from 1871 until his death.

== Marriage ==
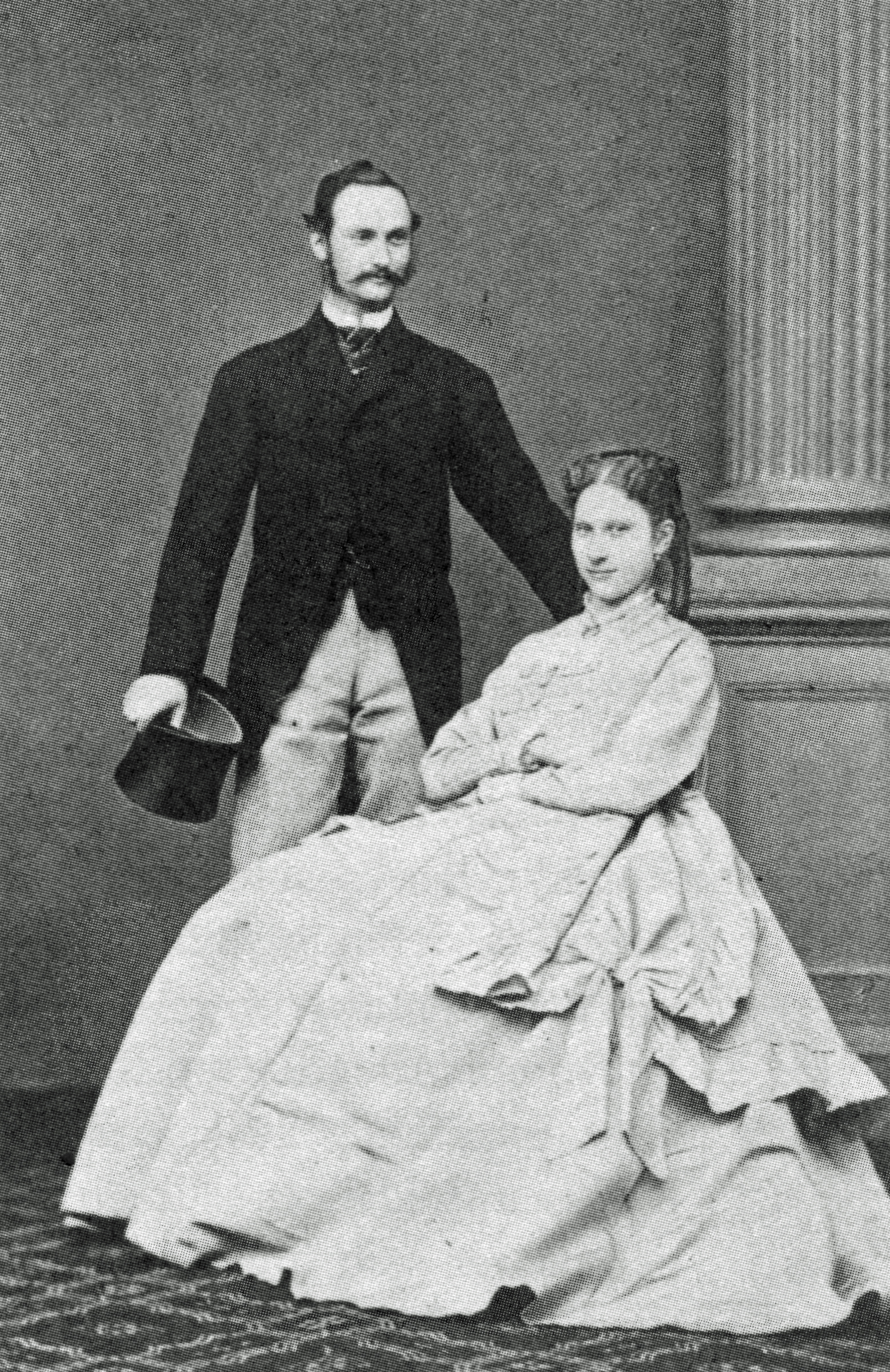
Crown Prince Frederick and Princess Louise of Sweden

Queen Louise wanted her eldest son to marry as well as had her two daughters, Alexandra and Dagmar. Queen Victoria of the United Kingdom had two yet unmarried daughters, Princess Helena and Princess Louise, and Queen Louise planned to have Frederick marry one of them. During his stay in England, Crown Prince Frederick actually took an interest in Princess Helena, and although his feelings were reciprocated, the connection did not materialize, as Queen Victoria opposed it. Victoria did not want her daughters to marry heirs to foreign thrones, as this would force them to live abroad, instead preferring German princes who could establish homes in England. In addition, Victoria had always been pro-German and another Danish alliance (Frederick's sister, Alexandra, had married Victoria's eldest son Albert Edward, Prince of Wales), would not have been in line with her German interests.

After this failed marriage attempt, attention turned instead to Princess Louise of Sweden, the only daughter of King Charles XV of Sweden. Princess Louise belonged to the Bernadotte dynasty, which had ruled in Sweden since 1818, when the founder, Jean-Baptiste Bernadotte, one of Napoleon Bonaparte's generals, was elected crown prince of Sweden in 1810 and later succeeded the throne as King Charles XIV John in 1818. He married Désirée Clary, who had once been engaged to the French Emperor. Charles XIV's son, Oscar I, had married Josephine of Leuchtenberg, the granddaughter of Napoleon's first wife, the Empress Josephine. King Oscar I and Queen Josephine were Princess Louise's paternal grandparents.

The marriage was suggested as a way of creating friendship between Denmark and Sweden. Relations between the two countries had been tense after Sweden had not assisted Denmark during the war with Prussia in 1864. Frederick and Louise had met for the first time in 1862, but in 1868, Frederick was invited to Sweden to get to know Louise, and their meeting was described as a success. In July that same year, Crown Prince Frederick—then 25 years old—became engaged to the 17-year-old Princess Louise. A year later, they were married in the chapel at the Royal Palace in Stockholm on 28 July 1869. Louise was the first Swedish princess to be married into the Danish royal house since the Middle Ages, and the marriage was welcomed in all three Scandinavian countries as a symbol of the new Scandinavism.

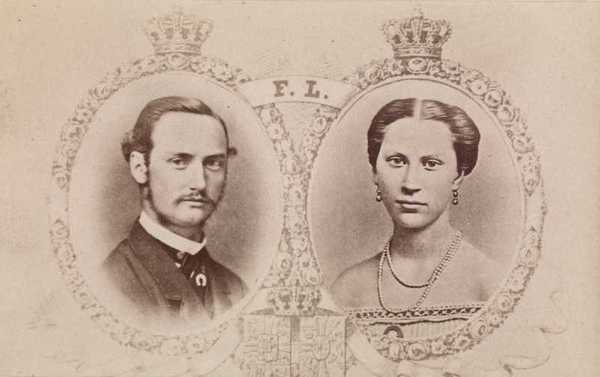
Crown Prince Frederick and Crown Princess Louise.

On 10 August 1869, the newlyweds made their entrance into Copenhagen, where they received a warm welcome. As their residence, the couple was awarded Frederick VIII's Palace, an 18th-century palace which forms part of the Amalienborg Palace complex in central Copenhagen. As their country residence they received Charlottenlund Palace, located on the shores of the Øresund Strait 10 kilometers north of Copenhagen. Here they had a refuge far away from court life at Amalienborg and here several of their children were born. Frederick and Louise had four sons and four daughters born between 1870 and 1890: Prince Christian, Prince Carl, Princess Louise, Prince Harald, Princess Ingeborg, Princess Thyra, Prince Gustav and Princess Dagmar. Their eldest sons, Christian and Carl, would become kings of Denmark and Norway respectively. Due to the many children, Charlottenlund Palace was rebuilt to accommodate the large family, and in 1880–81, the palace was expanded with a dome and two side wings.

== Heir apparent to the throne ==
Frederick was crown prince for 43 years and used the time to prepare carefully for his reign. Even though he, as heir apparent to the throne, had a seat in the Council of State, his father made sure to largely exclude him from influence and political power.

== Reign ==
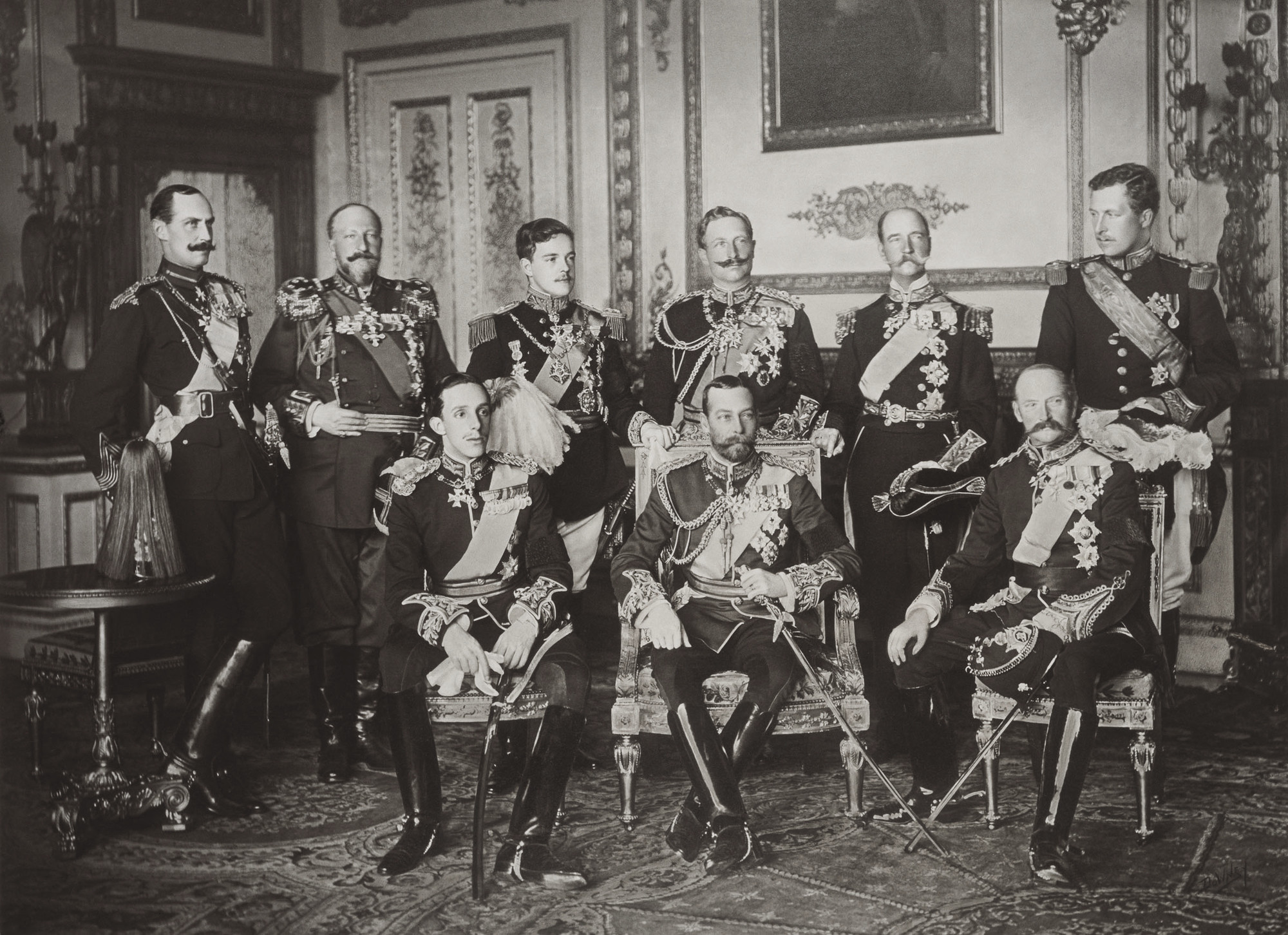
The Nine Sovereigns at Windsor for the funeral of King Edward VII, photographed on 20 May 1910. Standing, from left to right: Frederick VIII's son King Haakon VII of Norway, Tsar Ferdinand I of Bulgaria, King Manuel II of Portugal and the Algarves, Kaiser Wilhelm II of Germany, King George I of Greece and King Albert I of Belgium. Seated, from left to right: King Alfonso XIII of Spain, King George V of the United Kingdom and King Frederick VIII of Denmark.

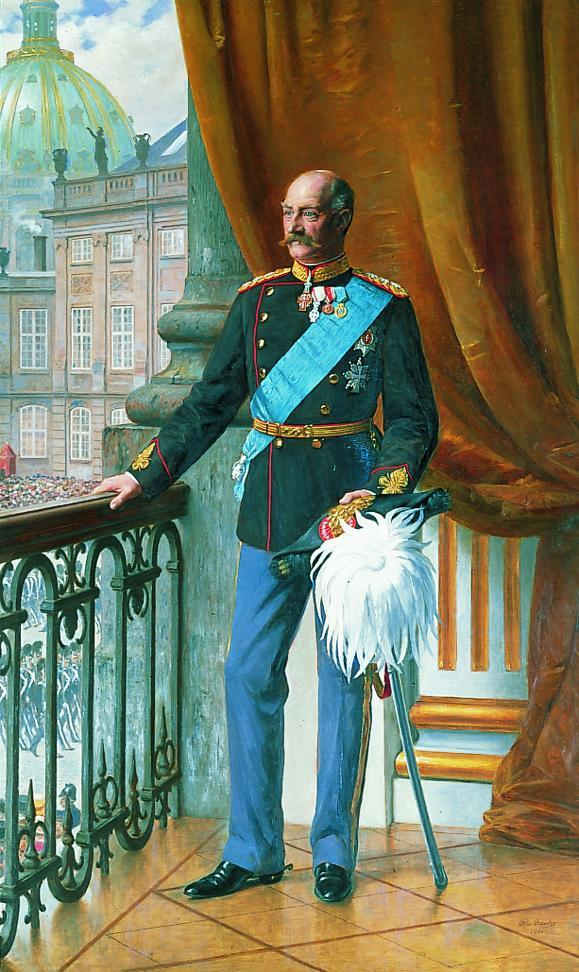
Portrait by Otto Bache (1910).

On 29 January 1906, King Christian IX died peacefully at the age of 87, after a reign of 43 years. Upon his father's death, Frederick succeeded to the throne at the age of 62. He was proclaimed king from the balcony of Christian VII's Palace at Amalienborg by the Prime Minister Jens Christian Christensen as Frederick VIII.

Due to his late accession to the throne, Frederick's reign would last only six years, throughout which he was plagued by ill health. In many ways, Frederick VIII was a liberal monarch who was much more favorable to the new parliamentarian system than his father had been, being reform-minded and democratically inclined.

== Death ==
On 14 May 1912, while on his return journey from a trip to Nice with his wife and four of his children, the king made a short stop in Hamburg, staying at the Hotel Hamburger Hof under the pseudonym "Count Kronberg". That evening, Frederick—while incognito—went out for a stroll on the Jungfernstieg, during which he became faint and collapsed on a park bench at Gänsemarkt. He was discovered by a police officer who took him to the hospital, where he was pronounced dead; his cause of death was announced as a heart attack. As Frederick was incognito at the time and had no papers on him, his body was brought to the local morgue, where he was identified by the hotel manager the next morning.

Rumors soon began to circulate about a possible scandal involving the king, as the place where he collapsed and died at was near a well-known brothel. The local police did not disclose details about the investigation, for fear of causing distress to the royal family.

Frederick's body was transported via a special train to Travemünde, after which he was brought back to Denmark by the royal yacht Dannebrog. After lying in state at the chapel of Christiansborg Palace in Copenhagen, he was interred in Christian IX's Chapel in Roskilde Cathedral on the island of Zealand, the traditional burial site for Danish monarchs since the 15th century.

== Descendants ==
The reigning families of Denmark, Norway, Belgium and Luxembourg are descended from King Frederick VIII; Denmark's through his eldest son Christian X, and Norway's through his second son, Haakon VII as well as through his daughter, Princess Ingeborg of Denmark. The royal family of Belgium and grand ducal family of Luxembourg are both also descended from Princess Ingeborg of Denmark.

== Titles, styles, honours, and arms ==
=== Titles and styles ===
During his reign, the King's full style was: His Majesty Frederick VIII, By the Grace of God, King of Denmark, of the Wends and of the Goths, Duke of Schleswig, Holstein, Stormarn, Dithmarschen, Lauenburg and Oldenburg. (Note: In spite of the fact that Denmark had lost the duchies as a consequence of the Treaty of Vienna in 1864, this style continued to be used until the 1972 accession of Queen Margrethe II.)

=== Honours ===
The Kronprins Frederiks Bro in Frederikssund and King Frederick VIII Land in Greenland are named after him.

National orders and decorations

- Knight of the Elephant, 3 June 1861
- Cross of Honour of the Order of the Dannebrog, 3 June 1861
- Grand Commander of the Dannebrog, 28 July 1869
- Commemorative Medal for the Golden Wedding of King Christian IX and Queen Louise, 1892

Foreign orders and decorations

- Ascanian duchies: Grand Cross of the Order of Albert the Bear, 4 April 1863
- (Austrian Empire) (Kingdom of Hungary) Austria-Hungary: Grand Cross of the Royal Hungarian Order of St. Stephen, 1873
- Baden:
  - Knight of the House Order of Fidelity, 1881
  - Knight of the Order of Berthold the First, 1881
- Bavaria: Knight of St. Hubert, 1908
- Belgium: Grand Cordon of the Order of Leopold (military), 23 May 1866
- Bulgaria:
  - Knight of Saints Cyril and Methodius, with Collar
  - Grand Cross of St. Alexander
- (Saxe-Coburg and Gotha) (Duchy of Saxe-Altenburg) (Saxe-Meiningen) Ernestine duchies: Grand Cross of the Saxe-Ernestine House Order
- France: Grand Cross of the Legion of Honour
- Greece: Grand Cross of the Redeemer
- Hawaii: Grand Cross of the Order of Kalākaua
- Hesse and by Rhine: Grand Cross of the Ludwig Order, 5 May 1865
- Italy: Knight of the Annunciation, 10 May 1875
- Japan: Grand Cordon of the Order of the Chrysanthemum, 18 May 1888
- Mecklenburg: Grand Cross of the Wendish Crown, with Crown in Ore and in Diamonds, 28 May 1884
- (Duchy of Nassau) Nassau Ducal Family: Knight of the Gold Lion of Nassau
- Netherlands: Grand Cross of the Netherlands Lion
- Oldenburg: Grand Cross of the Order of Duke Peter Friedrich Ludwig, with Golden Crown
- Ottoman Empire: Order of Osmanieh, 1st Class in Diamonds
- Portugal:
  - Grand Cross of the Royal Military Order of Our Lord Jesus Christ
  - Grand Cross of the Tower and Sword
  - Grand Cross of Our Lady of Conception
  - Grand Cross of the Sash of the Three Orders
- Prussia:
  - Knight of the Black Eagle, 8 December 1866
  - Grand Cross of the Red Eagle
- Romania:
  - Grand Cross of the Star of Romania
  - Grand Cross of the Crown of Romania
- Russia:
  - Knight of St. Andrew, 1864
  - Knight of St. Alexander Nevsky
  - Knight of the White Eagle
  - Knight of St. Anna, 1st Class
  - Knight of St. Stanislaus, 1st Class
  - Knight of St. Vladimir, 4th Class
- Saxe-Weimar-Eisenach: Grand Cross of the White Falcon, 1882
- (Thailand) Siam:
  - Knight of the Order of the Royal House of Chakri, 15 July 1897
  - Grand Cross of the White Elephant
- Spain: Knight of the Golden Fleece, 19 April 1883
- Sweden-Norway:
  - Grand Cross of St. Olav, with Collar, 18 July 1862
  - Knight of the Seraphim, with Collar, 7 August 1862
  - Knight of the Order of Charles XIII, 4 November 1871
  - Commander Grand Cross of the Sword
- United Kingdom:
  - Honorary Grand Cross of the Bath (civil), 10 March 1888
  - Stranger Knight Companion of the Garter, 21 July 1896
  - Honorary Grand Cross of the Royal Victorian Order, 8 March 1901
  - Recipient of the Royal Victorian Chain, 9 August 1902

Honorary military appointments

- Colonel-in-Chief of The Buffs (Royal East Kent Regiment), 1906 – 1912 (United Kingdom)
- À la suite of the Imperial German Navy
- Honorary General of the Swedish Army, 1891 (Sweden-Norway)

== Issue ==
Name	Birth	Death	Spouse	Children
Christian X of Denmark	26 September 1870	20 April 1947	Duchess Alexandrine of Mecklenburg-Schwerin	Frederik IX of Denmark; Knud, Hereditary Prince of Denmark
Haakon VII of Norway	3 August 1872	21 September 1957	Princess Maud of Wales	Olav V of Norway
Princess Louise of Denmark	17 February 1875	4 April 1906	Prince Frederick of Schaumburg-Lippe	Marie Louise, Princess Friedrich Sigismund of Prussia; Prince Christian of Schaumburg-Lippe; Stephanie, Princess of Bentheim and Steinfurt
Prince Harald of Denmark	8 October 1876	30 March 1949	Princess Helena Adelaide of Schleswig-Holstein-Sonderburg-Glücksburg	Feodora, Princess Christian of Schaumburg-Lippe; Caroline-Mathilde, Hereditary Princess of Denmark; Alexandrine-Louise, Countess Luitpold of Castell-Castell; Prince Gorm of Denmark; Count Oluf of Rosenborg
Princess Ingeborg of Denmark	2 August 1878	12 March 1958	Prince Carl, Duke of Västergötland	Margaretha, Princess Axel of Denmark; Märtha, Crown Princess of Norway; Astrid, Queen of the Belgians; Prince Carl Bernadotte
Princess Thyra of Denmark	14 March 1880	2 November 1945	unmarried	none
Prince Gustav of Denmark	4 March 1887	5 October 1944	unmarried	none
Princess Dagmar of Denmark	23 May 1890	11 October 1961	Jørgen Castenskiold	Carl Castenskiold; Christian Castenskiold; Jørgen Castenskiold; Dagmar Larsen; Christian Frederik Castenskiold

== Notes ==
Frederick VIII House of Schleswig-Holstein-Sonderburg-Glücksburg Cadet branch of the House of Oldenburg Born: 3 June 1843 Died: 14 May 1912
Regnal titles
Preceded by Christian IX	King of Denmark; 1906–1912	Succeeded by Christian X
