= Princess Alexandrine-Louise of Denmark =

Princess Alexandrine-Louise
- Countess Luitpold of Castell-Castell
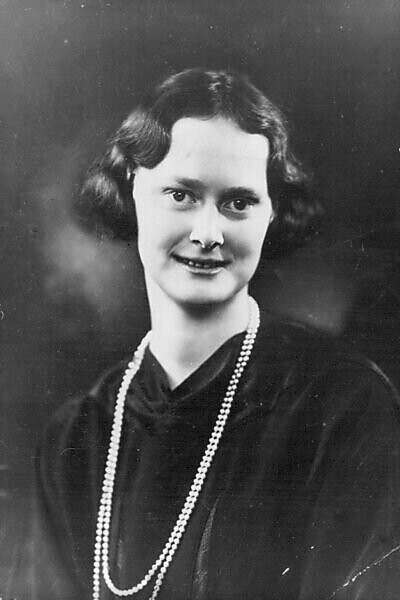
- Alexandrine-Louise in 1937
- Born: 12 December 1914; Jægersborghus, Copenhagen, Denmark
- Died: 26 April 1962 (aged 47); Copenhagen, Denmark
- Spouse: Count Luitpold of Castell-Castell (m. 1937; died 1941)
- Issue: Countess Amélie; Countess Thyra; Count Otto
Names
- Alexandrine-Louise Caroline-Mathilde Dagmar
- House: Glücksburg
- Father: Prince Harald of Denmark
- Mother: Princess Helena Adelaide of Schleswig-Holstein-Sonderburg-Glücksburg

Princess Alexandrine-Louise of Denmark (Alexandrine-Louise Caroline-Mathilde Dagmar) (12 December 1914 – 26 April 1962) was a Danish princess as the daughter of Prince Harald of Denmark and granddaughter of Frederick VIII of Denmark.

As the wife of Count Luitpold of Castell-Castell, she became a countess of Castell-Castell by marriage.

== Early life ==
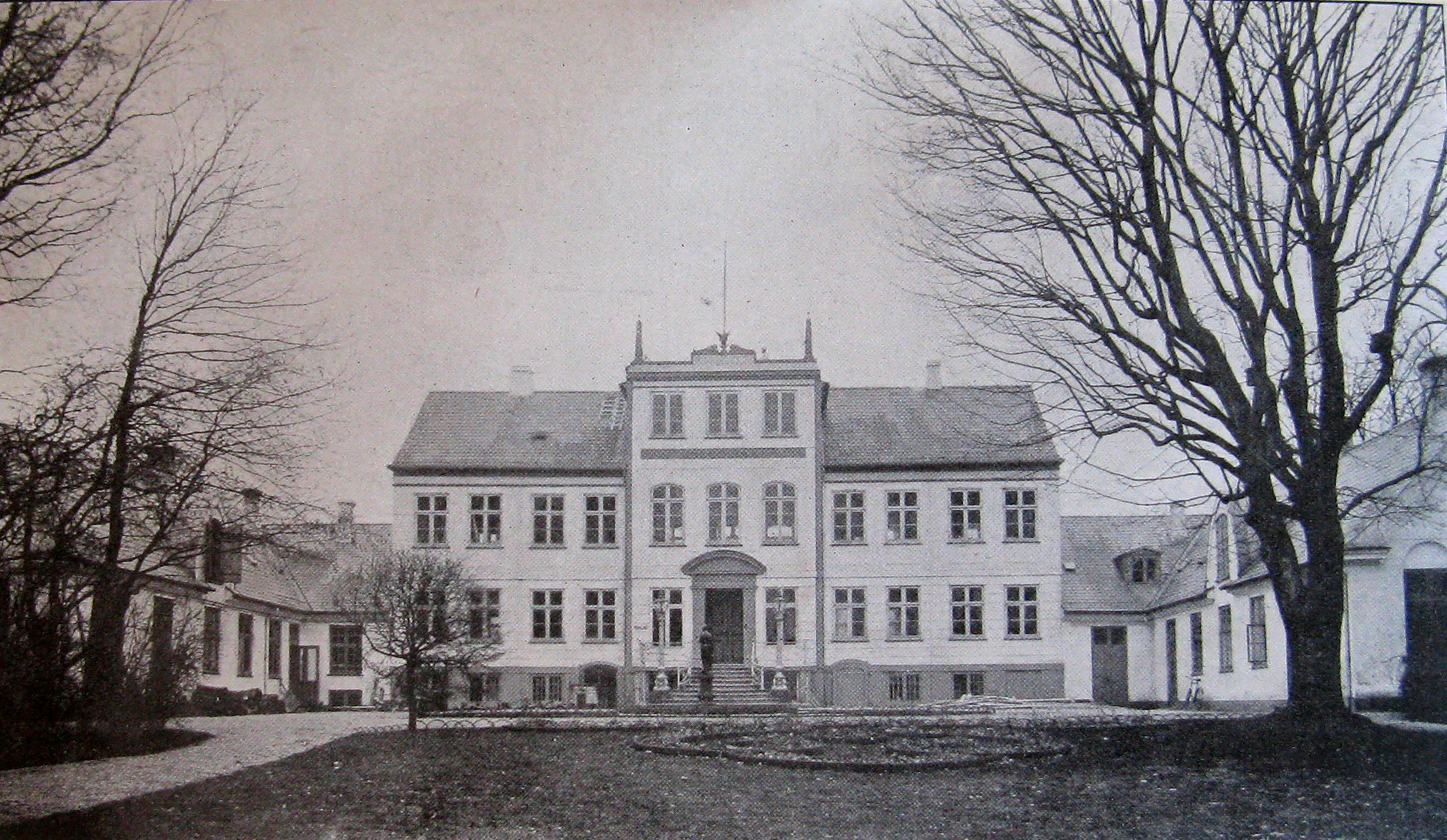
Princess Alexandrine-Louise's birthplace Jægersborghus in 1909.

Princess Alexandrine-Louise was born on 12 December 1914 at the Jægersborghus country house in Gentofte north of Copenhagen, Denmark.

She was the third child and daughter of Prince Harald of Denmark, son of King Frederick VIII of Denmark and Princess Louise of Sweden. Her mother was Princess Helena of Schleswig-Holstein-Sonderburg-Glücksburg, daughter of Friedrich Ferdinand, Duke of Schleswig-Holstein-Sonderburg-Glücksburg and Princess Karoline Mathilde of Schleswig-Holstein-Sonderburg-Augustenburg.

== Marriage and issue ==
Before her marriage, Alexandrine-Louise was frequently mentioned as a possible queen consort to Edward VIII of the United Kingdom.

On 24 August 1936, her engagement to Count Luitpold of Castell-Castell, eldest child and son of Count Otto Friedrich of Castell-Castell and his wife, Princess Amélie of Löwenstein-Wertheim-Freudenberg, was announced by special permission of Alexandrine-Louise's uncle Christian X of Denmark. The couple had met for the first time in Berlin during the 1936 Summer Olympics. Following their first meeting, Luitpold and Alexandrine-Louise spent nearly every day together. Before her departure from Berlin, Luitpold proposed marriage and Alexandrine-Louise accepted. At the time of their engagement announcement, Luitpold was a law student residing in Munich.

Luitpold and Alexandrine-Louise were married on 22 January 1937 at Christiansborg Palace in Copenhagen, Denmark. Footage of the wedding on nitrate film is preserved by the Danish Film Institute in their bunker archive for nitrate film at Store Dyrehave in Hillerød. According to the film archivist Karin Bonde Johansen regarding the scenes captured by the film, "the atmosphere looks cheerful and wild looking, but unfortunately there is no audio to the footage."

The couple had three children:

- Amélie Alexandrine Helene Caroline Mathilde Pauline (b. Berlin 25 May 1938); m. Hochburg (civil) 3 September 1965 (religious) 5 September 1965 Oscar Ritter von Miller zu Aichholz (b. Vienna 7 July 1934) has issue
- Thyra Antonie Marie-Therese Feodora Agnes (b. Berlin 14 September 1939; d. 10 September 2026); m. Copenhagen 3 November 1961 Karl Moritz Moes (b. Copenhagen 17 October 1937) has issue
- Otto-Luitpold Gustav Friedrich Christian Harald Carl (Berlin 13 March 1942 – Berlin 19 March 1943)

== Later life ==
Count Luitpold was killed in action in World War II in Bankya near Sofia, Bulgaria on 6/8 November 1941.

Countess Alexandrine-Louise died in Copenhagen on 26 April 1962.

== Ancestry ==
Ancestors of Princess Alexandrine-Louise of Denmark

8. Christian IX of Denmark
4. Frederick VIII of Denmark
9. Princess Louise of Hesse-Kassel
2. Prince Harald of Denmark
10. Charles XV of Sweden
5. Princess Louise of Sweden
11. Princess Louise of the Netherlands
1. Princess Alexandrine-Louise of Denmark
12. Friedrich, Duke of Schleswig-Holstein-Sonderburg-Glücksburg
6. Friedrich Ferdinand, Duke of Schleswig-Holstein
13. Princess Adelheid of Schaumburg-Lippe
3. Princess Helena of Schleswig-Holstein-Sonderburg-Glücksburg
14. Frederick VIII, Duke of Schleswig-Holstein
7. Princess Karoline Mathilde of Schleswig-Holstein-Sonderburg-Augustenburg
15. Princess Adelheid of Hohenlohe-Langenburg
