= Count Luitpold of Castell-Castell =

German nobleman

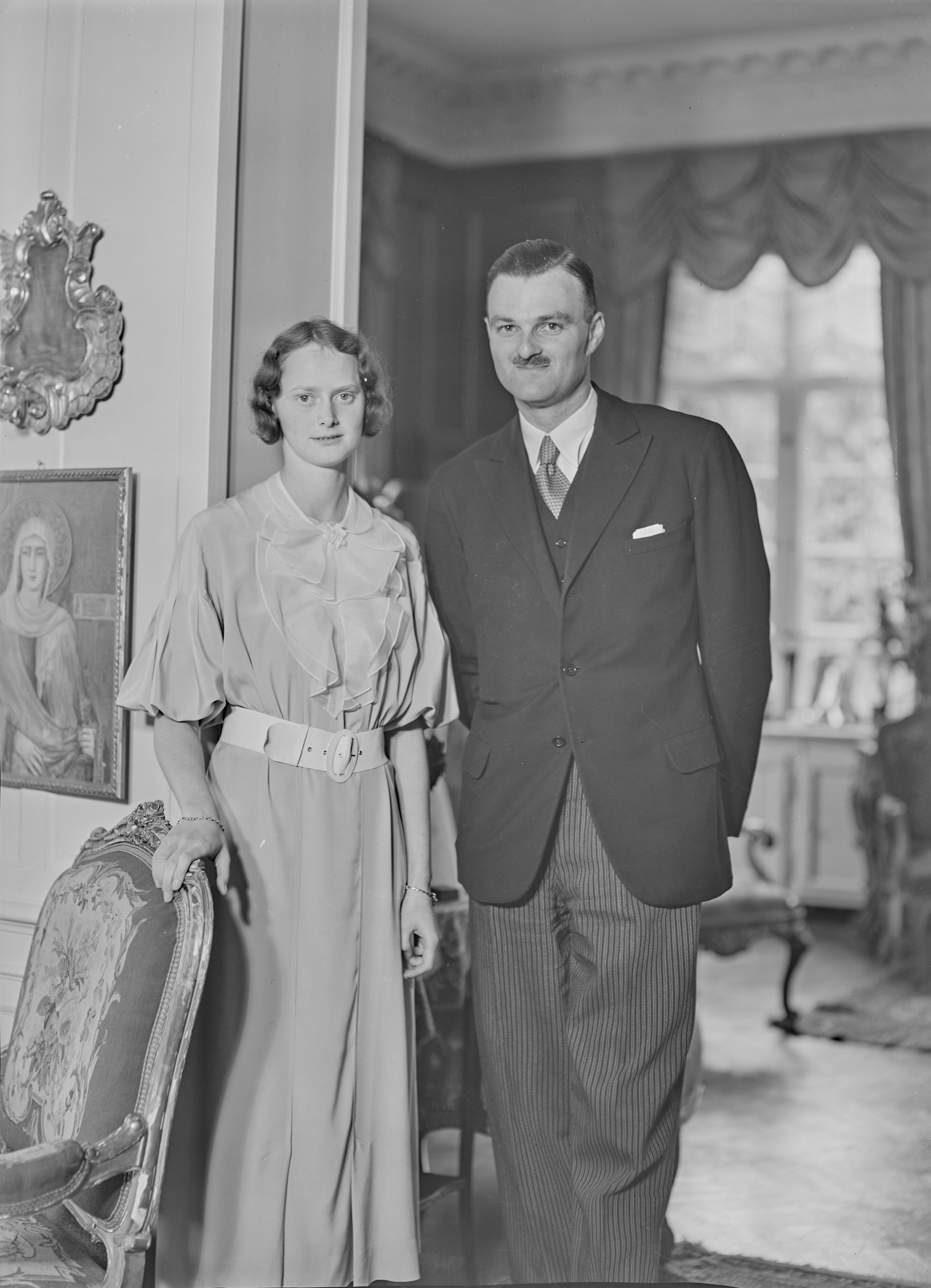
- Count Luitpold with Princess Alexandrine, 1936
- Born: 14 November 1904; Castle Langenzell, Wiesenbach, Grand Duchy of Baden
- Died: 6 November 1941 (aged 36); Bankya near Sofia, Kingdom of Bulgaria
- Spouse: Princess Alexandrine-Louise of Denmark (m. 1937)
- Issue: Countess Amélie; Countess Thyra; Count Otto-Luitpold
Names
- Leopold Alfred Frederick Charles; German: Luitpold Alfred Friedrich Karl
- House: Castell-Castell
- Father: Count Otto Friedrich of Castell-Castell
- Mother: Princess Amélie of Löwenstein-Wertheim-Freudenberg
- Military career
- Allegiance: Nazi Germany
- Branch: German Army
- Service years: ?–1941
- Rank: Oberleutnant
- Conflicts: World War II

Count Luitpold Alfred Friedrich Karl of Castell-Castell (German: Luitpold Alfred Friedrich Karl Graf zu Castell-Castell; born November 14, 1904 in Langenzell, Wiesenbach, Grand Duchy of Baden – died November 6, 1941 in Bankya near Sofia, Kingdom of Bulgaria) was a German jurist (Dr. jur.), staff officer in the German Army during World War II and a member of the extended Danish Royal Family through his marriage to Princess Alexandrine-Louise of Denmark. He was a Count of Castell-Castell and a member of the Comital House of Castell-Castell.

== Family ==
Luitpold was born on November 14, 1904, in Langenzell, Wiesenbach, Grand Duchy of Baden and was the eldest child and son of Generalmajor Otto Friedrich Graf zu Castell-Castell (1868–1939), aide-de-camp (Flügeladjutant) to the King of Bavaria, and his wife, Serene Highness (Durchlaut) Amélie Caroline Ludwiga Gabriele Prinzessin zu Löwenstein-Wertheim-Freudenberg (1883–1978).

== Marriage and issue ==
Luitpold's engagement to Princess Alexandrine-Louise of Denmark, third child and daughter of Prince Harald of Denmark and his wife Princess Helena Adelaide of Schleswig-Holstein-Sonderburg-Glücksburg, was announced on August 24, 1936, by special permission of Alexandrine-Louise's uncle Christian X of Denmark. Until the announcement, Alexandrine-Louise had been frequently mentioned as a possible queen consort to Edward VIII. The couple met for the first time in Berlin during the 1936 Summer Olympics. Following their first meeting, Luitpold and Alexandrine-Louise spent nearly every day together. Before her departure from Berlin, Luitpold proposed marriage and Alexandrine-Louise accepted. At the time of their engagement announcement, Luitpold was a law student residing in Munich.

Luitpold and Alexandrine-Louise were married on January 22, 1937, at Christiansborg Palace in Copenhagen, Kingdom of Denmark. Footage of the wedding on nitrate film is preserved by the Danish Film Institute in their bunker archive for nitrate film at Store Dyrehave in Hillerød. According to the film archivist Karin Bonde Johansen regarding the scenes captured by the film, "the atmosphere looks cheerful and wild looking, but unfortunately there is no audio to the footage."

Luitpold and Alexandrine-Louise had three children:

- Countess Amélie Alexandrine Helene Caroline Mathilde Pauline of Castell-Castell (b. Berlin May 25, 1938); m. Hochburg (civil) September 3, 1965 (religious) September 5, 1965, Oscar Ritter von Miller zu Aichholz (b. Vienna July 7, 1934)
- Countess Thyra Antonie Marie-Therese Feodora Agnes of Castell-Castell (b. Berlin September 14, 1939 - d. September 10, 2026); m. Copenhagen November 3, 1961, Karl Moritz Moes (b. Copenhagen October 17, 1937)
- Count Otto Luitpold Gustav Friedrich Christian Harald Carl Castell-Castell (b. Berlin March 13, 1942 – d. Berlin March 19, 1943)

== Military service and death ==
Luitpold, among other things a Knight of Honour (Ehrenritter) of the Order of Saint John (Bailiwick of Brandenburg) and recipient of the Grand Cross of the Danish Order of the Dannebrog, was a First Lieutenant (Oberleutnant) in the German Army during World War II. He was severely wounded as a flight passenger when the Ju 52 (CE + AS; Werknummer: 5382) he was on, during a courier flight from Belgrade to Athens, crashed due to ice on the wings on 28 October 1941. He died on 6 November 1941 in the Kriegslazarett 1/602 in Bankya near Sofia at the age of 36. Luitpold was interred at Bankya, and reinterred in the Castell-Castell family plot at the cemetery in Hochburg.

== Ancestry ==
Ancestors of Count Luitpold of Castell-Castell

8. Friedrich Ludwig, Count of Castell-Castell
4. Carl, Count of Castell-Castell
9. Princess Emilie of Hohenlohe-Langenburg
2. Count Otto Friedrich of Castell-Castell
10. Carl, Count of Solms-Rödelheim-Assenheim
5. Countess Emma of Solms-Rödelheim-Assenheim
11. Countess Amalie of Erbach-Schönberg
1. Count Luitpold of Castell-Castell
12. Wilhelm, Prince of Löwenstein-Wertheim-Freudenberg
6. Prince Alfred of Löwenstein-Wertheim-Freudenberg
13. Countess Olga Clara of Schönburg-Forderglauchau
3. Princess Amélie of Löwenstein-Wertheim-Freudenberg
14. Count Wilhelm of Reichenbach
7. Countess Pauline of Reichenbach-Lessonitz
15. Baroness Amalie Göller of Ravensburg
