= Prince Harald of Denmark =

Danish prince (1876–1949)

Prince Harald
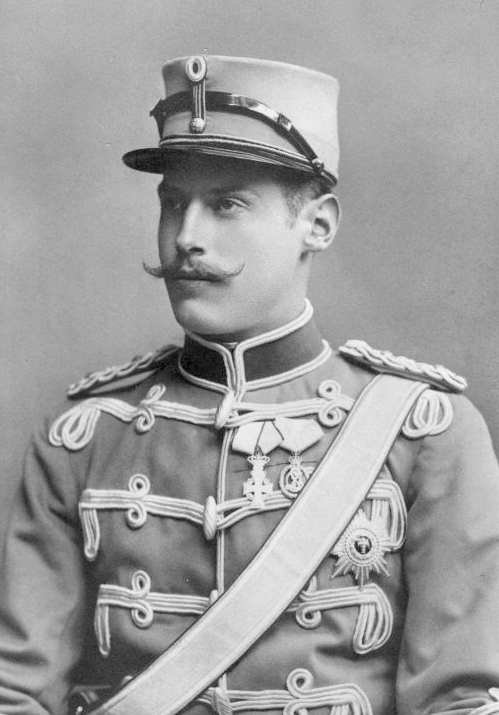
- Harald in 1911
- Born: 8 October 1876; Charlottenlund Palace, Gentofte, Denmark
- Died: 30 March 1949 (aged 72); Copenhagen, Denmark
- Spouse: Princess Helena of Schleswig-Holstein-Sonderburg-Glücksburg (m. 1909)
- Issue: Feodora, Princess Christian of Schaumburg-Lippe; Caroline-Mathilde, Hereditary Princess of Denmark; Alexandrine-Louise, Countess Luitpold of Castell-Castell; Prince Gorm; Prince Oluf
Names
- Harald Christian Frederik
- House: Glücksburg
- Father: Frederik VIII of Denmark
- Mother: Louise of Sweden

Prince Harald of Denmark (Harald Christian Frederik; 8 October 1876 – 30 March 1949) was a member of the Danish Royal Family. He was the third son and fourth child of Frederik VIII of Denmark and Lovisa of Sweden, and thus the brother of Christian X of Denmark and Haakon VII of Norway.

The prince served in the Royal Danish Army for most of his life, and reached the rank of Lieutenant General.

== Early life ==
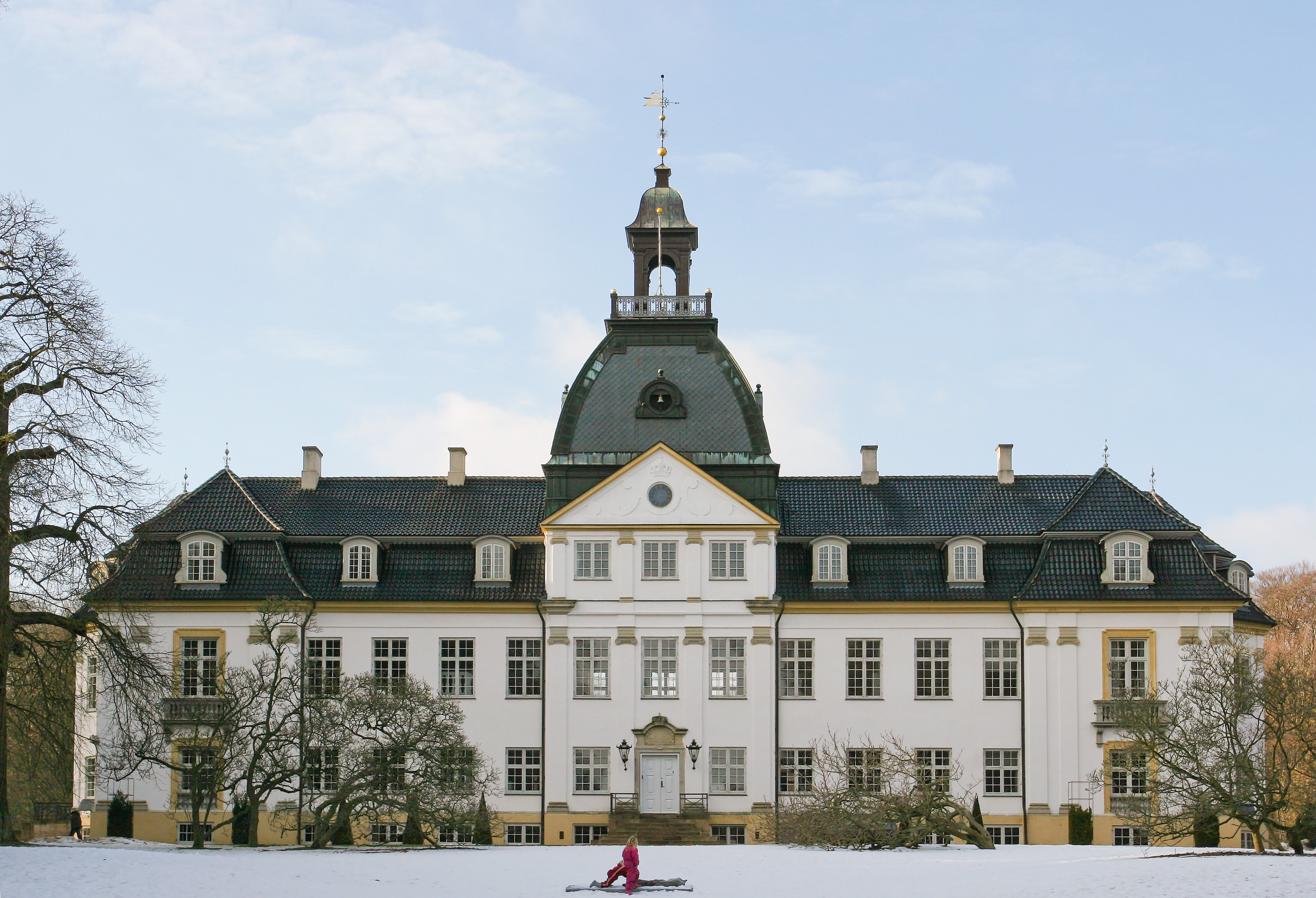
Prince Harald's birthplace, Charlottenlund Palace, photographed in 2006

Prince Harald was born on 8 October 1876 at his parents' country residence, the Charlottenlund Palace in Gentofte Municipality north of Copenhagen, during the reign of his paternal grandfather, King Christian IX. He was the fourth child and third son of Crown Prince Frederick of Denmark and his wife Louise of Sweden. His father was the eldest son of King Christian IX of Denmark and Louise of Hesse-Kassel, and his mother was the only daughter of King Charles XV of Sweden and Norway and Louise of the Netherlands. He was baptised with the names Harald Christian Frederik, and was known as Prince Harald.

Prince Harald was raised with his siblings in the royal household in Copenhagen, and grew up between his parents' city residence, the Frederik VIII's Palace, an 18th-century palace which forms part of the Amalienborg Palace complex in central Copenhagen, and their country residence, the Charlottenlund Palace, located by the coastline of the Øresund strait north of the city. At the age of 17, Prince Harald entered a military career as was customary for princes at the time. He later served with the Guard Hussar Regiment.

== Marriage ==
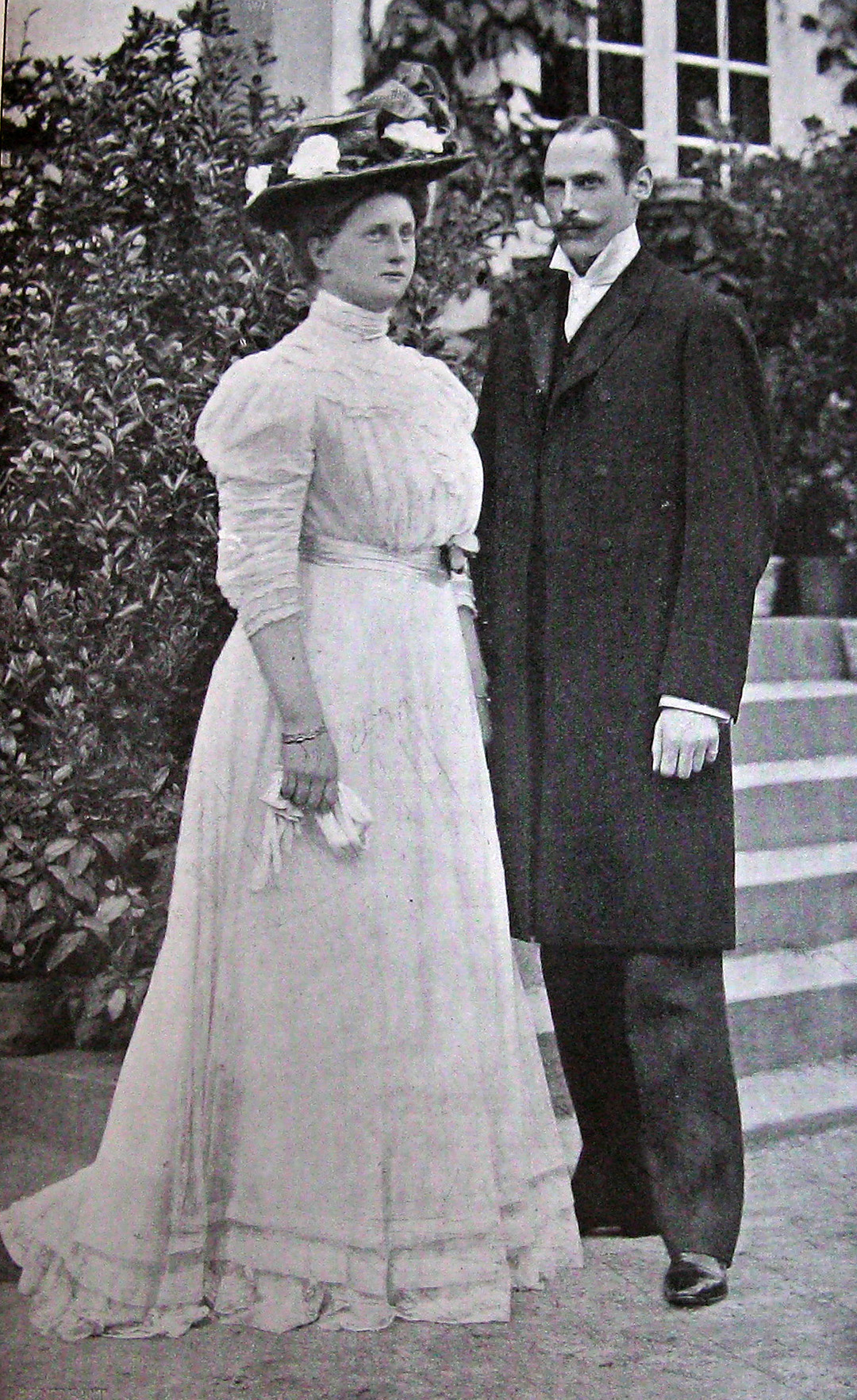
Prince Harald and Princess Helena in 1909

At the age of 33, on 28 April 1909 at Glücksburg Castle in Schleswig-Holstein, Prince Harald married his second cousin Princess Helena of Schleswig-Holstein-Sonderburg-Glücksburg, daughter of Frederick Ferdinand, Duke of Schleswig-Holstein-Sonderburg-Glücksburg and Princess Karoline Mathilde of Schleswig-Holstein-Sonderburg-Augustenburg.

After their marriage, Prince Harald and Princess Helena lived at the Jægersborghus country house north of Copenhagen which Prince Harald had purchased in 1907. Here their five children were born between 1910 and 1923.

== Later life ==
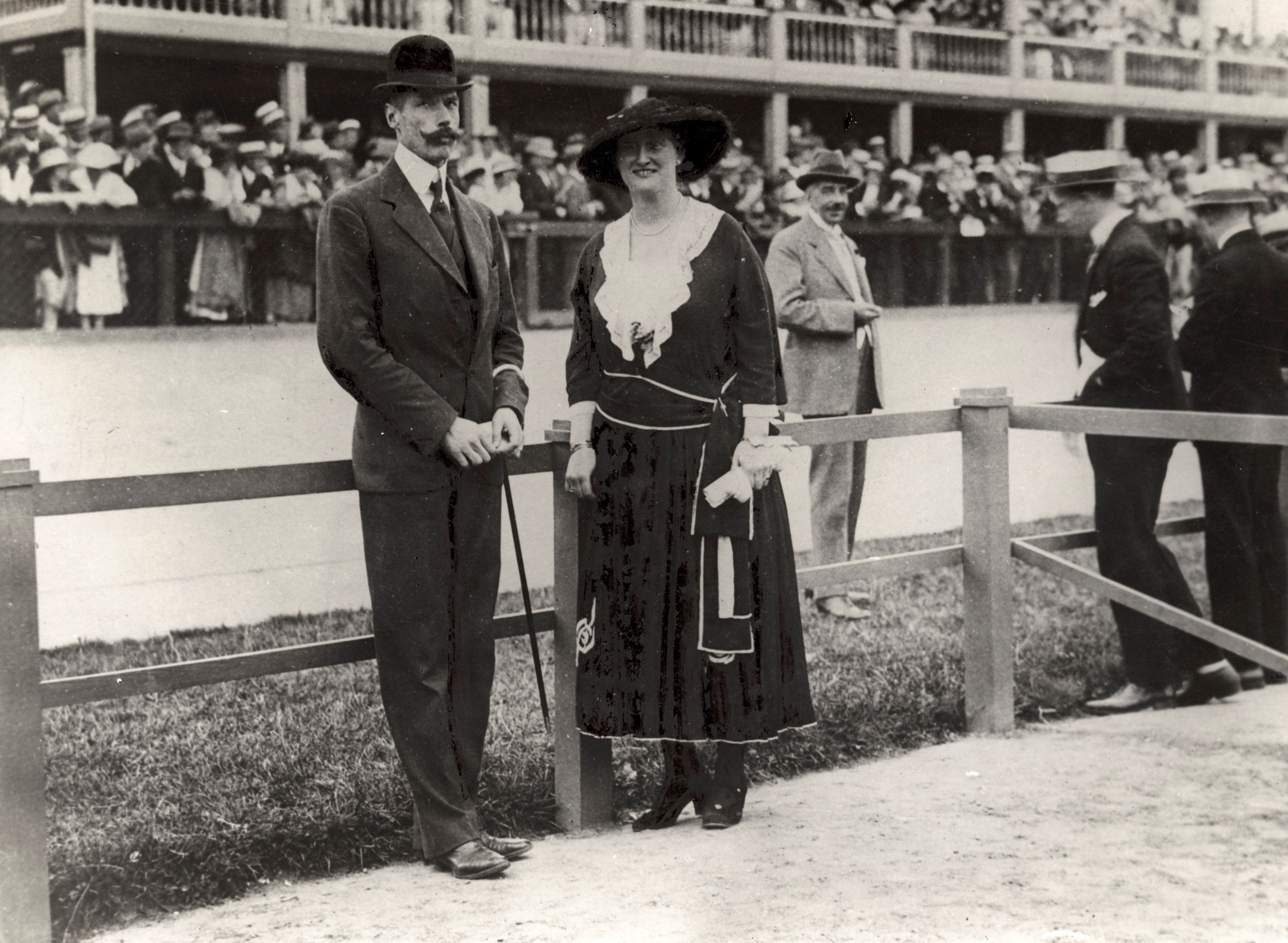
Prince Harald and Princess Helena attending the 1921 world track cycling championships at the Ordrup velodrome in Copenhagen.

Like other members of the Danish royal family, his economic situation was influenced by the failure of Den Danske Landmandsbank in 1923. Until 1935, however, he and his family were able to stay at Jægersborghus but then moved to a villa in the northern part of Copenhagen.

At the age of 50, Prince Harald retired from active service with the rank of Major General. In 1933, however, his brother King Christian X appointed him Lieutenant General.

During World War II, Princess Helena became very unpopular because of her sympathy for the German occupation of Denmark and the Nazi party. Because of this, she was reportedly not on speaking terms with her sons.

After the war, Princess Helena was not brought to trial, being a member of the royal family who did not wish any publicity on the matter, but was exiled from Denmark 30 May 1945 and placed under house arrest at the Glücksburg Castle in Germany. She was allowed to return to Denmark in 1947, when Prince Harald fell gravely ill. She stayed with her spouse until his death two years later.

Prince Harald died on 30 March 1949 in Copenhagen. As a Danish prince, he was buried at Roskilde Cathedral on the island of Zealand, the traditional burial site for Danish monarchs since the 15th century. Princess Helena survived her husband by 13 years and died on 30 June 1962.

== Honours ==
National decorations

- RE – Knight of the Elephant, 28 July 1894
- DM – Cross of Honour of the Order of the Dannebrog, 28 July 1894
- SK – Grand Cross of the Dannebrog, 8 October 1917
- GbET – Commemorative Medal for the Golden Wedding of King Christian IX and Queen Louise
- MM 8 April 1918 – King Christian IX Centenary Medal

Foreign decorations

- Belgium: Grand Cordon of the Royal Order of Leopold
- France: Grand Cross of the Legion of Honour
- (German Empire) German Imperial and Royal Family:
  - Knight of the Black Eagle
  - Grand Cross of the Red Eagle
  - Mecklenburg: Grand Cross of the Wendish Crown, with Crown in Ore
  - Oldenburg: Grand Cross of the Order of Duke Peter Friedrich Ludwig, with Golden Crown
- (Greece) Greek Royal Family: Grand Cross of the Redeemer
- Norway:
  - Grand Cross of St. Olav, with Collar, 22 June 1906
  - Commemorative Medal for the Coronation of King Haakon VII and Queen Maud
- Sweden:
  - Knight of the Seraphim, 27 August 1897
  - Knight of the Order of Charles XIII, 1927
- Thailand: Grand Cordon of the Order of Chula Chom Klao
- United Kingdom: GCVO – Honorary Grand Cross of the Royal Victorian Order, 11 October 1901

== Issue ==
Harald and Helena had five children:

Name	Birth	Death	Notes
Princess Feodora	3 July 1910	17 March 1975	married her first cousin, Prince Christian of Schaumburg-Lippe and had issue.
Princess Caroline-Mathilde	27 April 1912	12 December 1995	married her first cousin Prince Knud of Denmark and had issue.
Princess Alexandrine-Louise	12 December 1914	26 April 1962	married Count Luitpold of Castell-Castell and had issue.
Prince Gorm	24 February 1919	26 December 1991	Unmarried and without issue.
Prince Oluf	10 March 1923	19 December 1990	Lost his title and became HE Count Oluf of Rosenborg after marrying without consent to Annie Helene Dorrit Puggard-Müller and to Lis Wulff-Juergensen. He has issue.

–==Ancestry==

Ancestors of Prince Harald of Denmark

8. Friedrich Wilhelm, Duke of Schleswig-Holstein-Sonderburg-Glücksburg
4. Christian IX, King of Denmark
9. Princess Louise Caroline of Hesse-Kassel
2. Frederik VIII, King of Denmark
10. Prince William of Hesse-Kassel
5. Princess Louise of Hesse-Kassel
11. Princess Charlotte of Denmark
1. Prince Harald of Denmark
12. Oscar I, King of Sweden and Norway
6. Charles XV, King of Sweden and Norway
13. Princess Joséphine of Leuchtenberg
3. Princess Louise of Sweden
14. Prince Frederick of the Netherlands
7. Princess Louise of the Netherlands
15. Princess Louise of Prussia
