= Schæffergården =

Building in Gentofte Municipality, Denmark

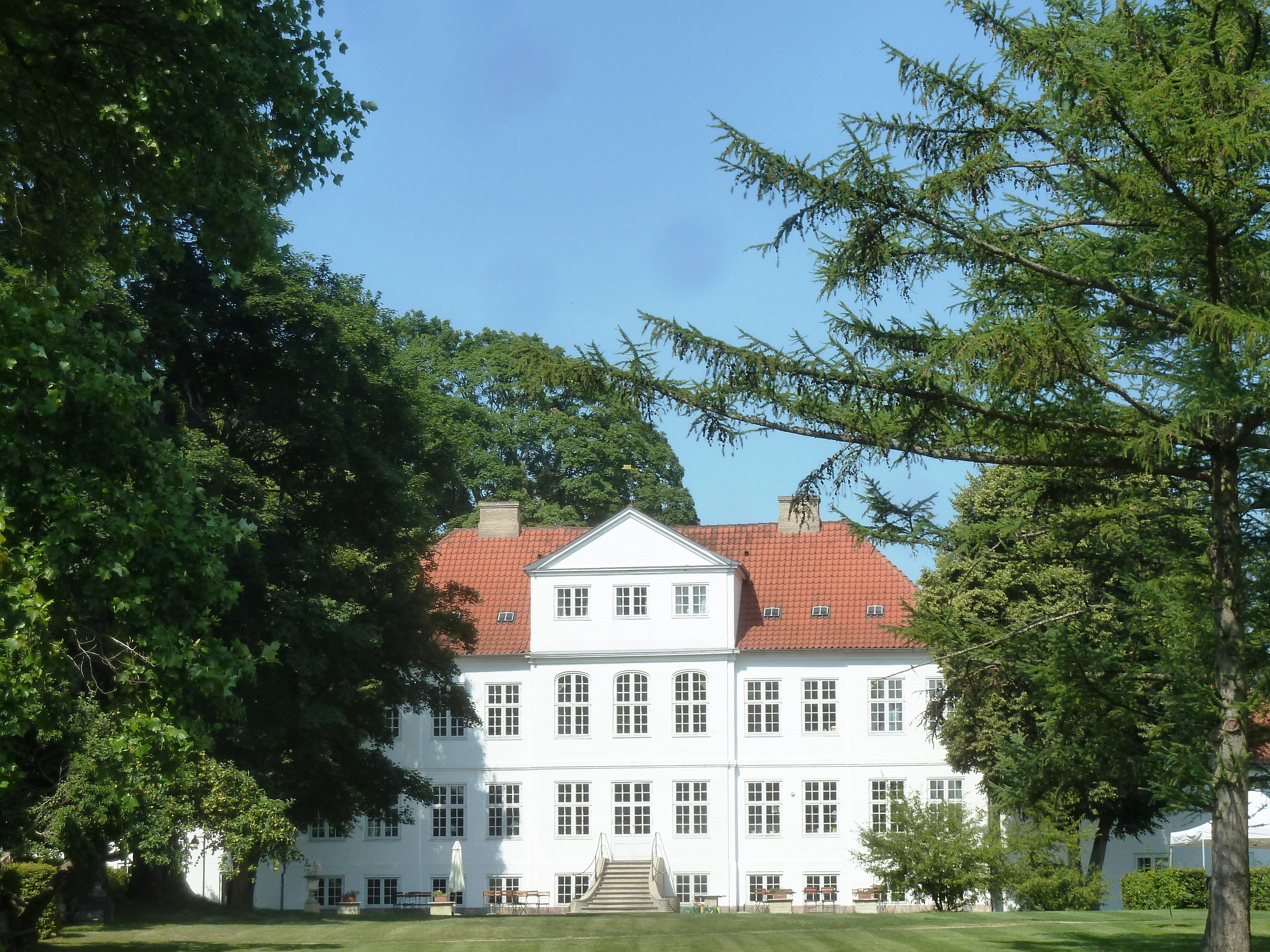
- Interactive map of the Schæffergården area

General information
- Architectural style: Rococo
- Location: Jægersborg, Gentofte Municipality, Copenhagen, Denmark
- Coordinates: 55°45′49.83″N 12°32′4.81″E
- Construction started: 1755
- Completed: 1756

Schæffergården, formerly Jægersborghus, is a Rococo-style mansion located on Jægersborg Allé in Jægersborg, Gentofte Municipality, some 15 kilometres north of central Copenhagen, Denmark. The listed main building was built by court carpenter Dietrich Schäffer in 1755-1756 . It has been owned by the Foundation for Danish-Norwegian Cooperation since the 1940s and is now operated as a conference centre following several renovations and expansions of the complex by architect such as Kaare Klint.

== History ==
In 1755, Dietrich Schäffer purchased a property with stables at Jægersborg in auction and began the consturciton of a large country house which was completed in 1756. Schäffer hoped to be able to sell it to the king as a replacement for the royal hunting lodge Ibstrup which had fallen into despair. His plan failed and the project brought him close to bankruptcy. In 1772, he finally managed to sell it.

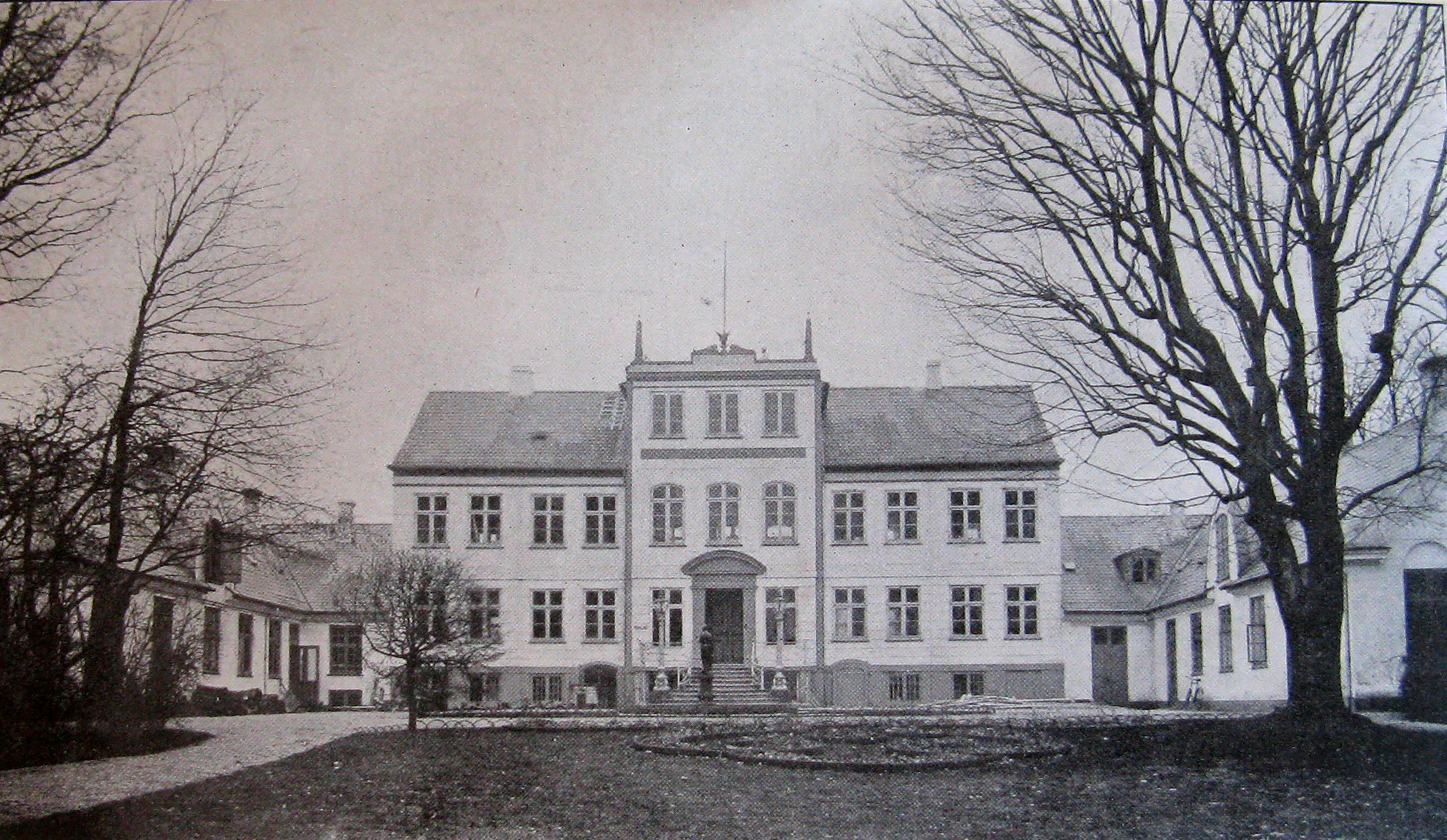
The house photographed by Peter Elfelt in 1909

Later owners include Prince Harald of Denmark. Prince Gorm was born in the building.

In 1920, Ernst Michaelsen, CEO of Vacuum Oil Company, purchased the property. He charged 32-year-old Kaare Klint with a restoration of the main building. When MiMichaelsen died, he left the property to the Michaelsen Foundation. In 1948, it was acquired by the Foundation for Danish-Norwegian Cooperation with the aim of creating a Norwegian centre for education and culture in Denmark. The main building was expanded with a new side wings designed by Palle Suenson in 1950–51. Vilhelm Wohlert expanded the complex with a three-storey building with dining room, kitchen and 20 rooms in 1972. Skaarup & Jespersen was in charge of another expansion of the conference facilities in 1986.
