= Prince Gorm of Denmark =

Danish prince (1919–1991)

Prince Gorm
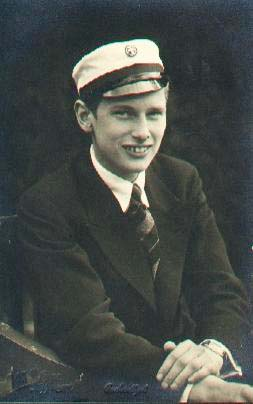
- Gorm in 1939
- Born: 24 February 1919; Jægersborghus Mansion, Gentofte, Denmark
- Died: 26 December 1991 (aged 72); Copenhagen, Denmark
Names
- Gorm Christian Frederik Hans Harald
- House: Glücksburg
- Father: Prince Harald of Denmark
- Mother: Princess Helena of Schleswig-Holstein-Sonderburg-Glücksburg

Prince Gorm of Denmark (Danish: Prins Gorm Christian Frederik Hans Harald til Danmark; b. Jægersborghus, 24 February 1919 – Copenhagen, 26 December 1991) was the first son of Prince Harald of Denmark and his wife, Princess Helena of Schleswig-Holstein-Sonderburg-Glücksburg.

He was an officer of the Royal Danish Navy.

As a result of the Act of Succession of 1953, which restricts the throne to those descended from Christian X and his wife, Alexandrine of Mecklenburg-Schwerin, through approved marriages, he lost his place in the line of succession unlike his brother Oluf in 1948.

During the late 1940s and early 1950s, Prince Gorm, a collateral prince and captain in the Royal Danish Army, was twice implicated in a serious misconduct case. He allegedly violated the Danish penal code's provisions on sexual offences (Danish: sædelighedsforbrydelse), offenses carrying multi-year prison sentences. Those provisions (§§220/225) indicated particularly serious sexual misconduct involving abuse of authority. The first incident was quietly resolved with a transfer. In the second, in 1953, soldiers threatened to shoot him, prompting fears of mutiny. He was summoned to Amalienborg Palace, and after a heated controversy with King Frederik IX, he was dismissed, although “with pension and in grace”. He was never charged or investigated because of his immunity. The military authorities and the Court Marshal's office covered up the case, and because the topic was taboo, it was only superficially covered in the press.

He died unmarried and without children.

== See also ==
- Descendants of Christian IX of Denmark - Lists members of European royalty who share a common ancestor with Prince Gorm of Denmark
