= Descendants of Christian IX of Denmark =

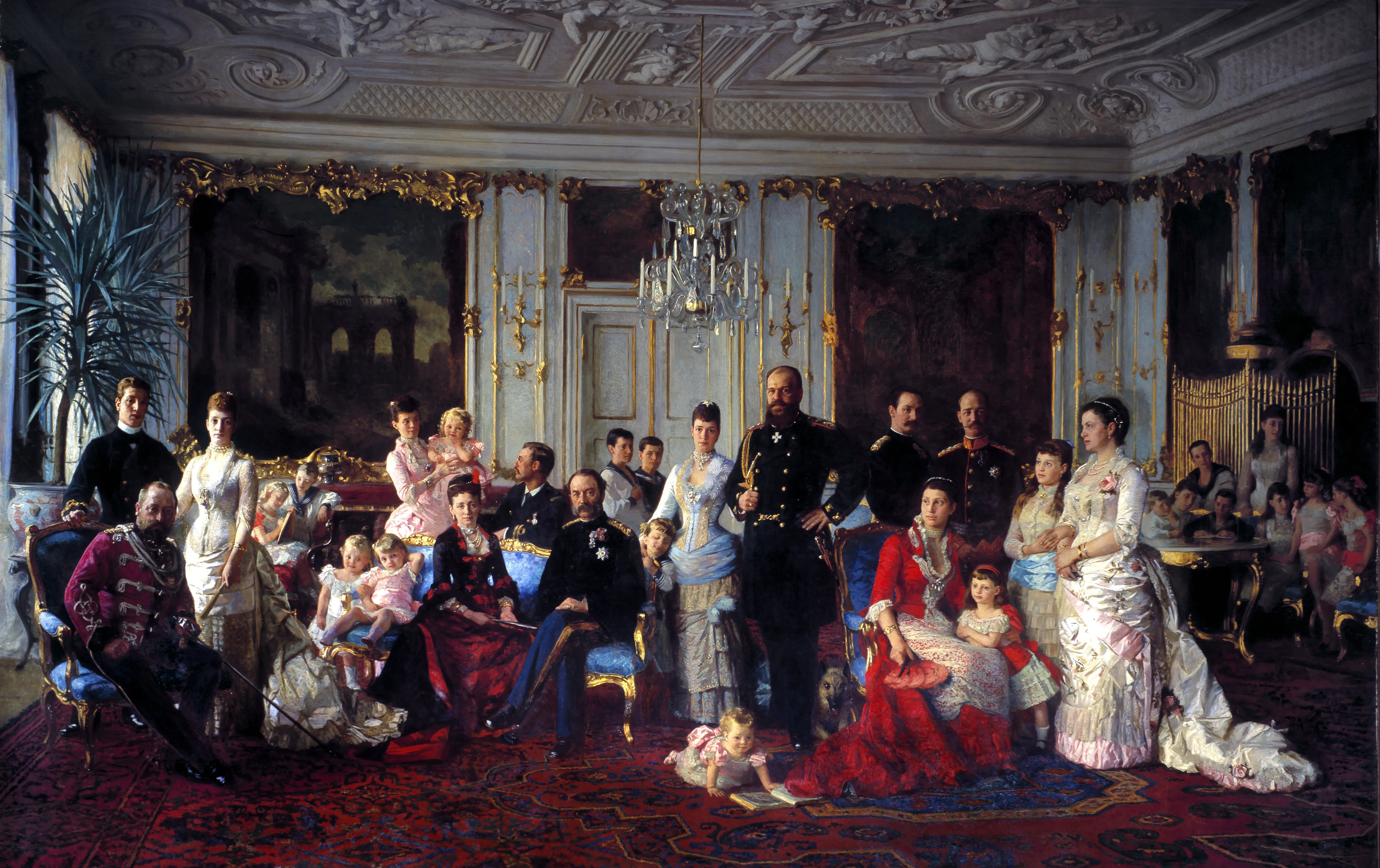
The Family of Christian IX of Denmark, 1886 painting by Laurits Tuxen

King Christian IX of Denmark (8 April 1818 – 29 January 1906), known as the "father-in-law of Europe", ruled Denmark from 1863 to 1906. He and his queen consort, Louise of Hesse-Kassel (7 September 1817 – 29 September 1898), became the ancestors of many members of European royalty.

In 1842, prior to becoming King of Denmark, Christian married Louise, whose familial connections allowed him to secure his status as the heir-presumptive to the Danish throne in 1852. Christian and Louise had three sons and three daughters together, and the couple actively involved themselves in their children's education because of their limited finances. Although Christian had an affectionate relationship with his daughters, he rejected his eldest son, Frederick, over political differences.

After the commencement of Christian's reign as King of Denmark, his popularity gradually improved among his subjects, partially because of Louise's efforts to marry their children with members of royal families across Europe, including their daughter Princess Alexandra with Albert Edward, Prince of Wales (later Edward VII), and their daughter Princess Dagmar with Alexander, Tsarevich of Russia (later Alexander III).

All of Christian and Louise's six children would go on to have progeny of their own. In addition, some of Christian and Louise's extended descendants would rule as monarchs themselves in European countries. For example, Christian and Louise's grandsons Constantine I, Nicholas II, and George V reigned over Greece, Russia, and the United Kingdom, respectively.

== Background ==
=== King Christian IX ===
For the first 13 years of his life, Christian lived in Germany. Following the death of his father, Friedrich Wilhelm, in 1831, Christian trained as an officer in Copenhagen. He fought on behalf of the Danish Unitary State in the First Schleswig War.

In 1852, Christian became the heir presumptive to the Danish throne. Following the death of his second cousin King Frederick VII 11 years later, Christian became King of Denmark. Due to Christian's German background, he was unpopular among his subjects during the start of his reign. He nearly abdicated in 1864 after Denmark's loss in the Second Schleswig War. Christian's popularity recovered, however, as his children married into several European royal families.

=== Queen Louise ===
Born Princess Louise of Hesse-Kassel, Louise became Queen of Denmark in 1863. Because her mother was a sister of King Christian VIII, Louise's marriage to Christian IX was an important factor in his rise to the Danish throne. Moreover, Louise was instrumental in marrying her children across European royalty, which helped increase her husband's popularity among the Danish people.

As Queen of Denmark, Louise exemplified the female ideas of her time. Despite remaining in the shadow of Christian, she showed artistic and social talent. Through her charity work, Louise founded the Diakonissestiftelsen in Copenhagen.

=== Marriage ===
Christian and Louise were married in 1842.

Family of Christian IX, King of Denmark
Portrait	Name	Birth	Death	Descendants
Portrait of King Christian IX of Denmark	Christian IX, King of Denmark r. 1863–1906	8 April 1818	29 January 1906	6 children, including: Frederick VIII, King of Denmark; Alexandra, Queen of the United Kingdom; George I, King of the Hellenes; Maria Feodorovna, Empress of Russia
Portrait of Queen Louise of Denmark	Princess Louise of Hesse-Kassel	7 September 1817	29 September 1898	6 children, including: Frederick VIII, King of Denmark; Alexandra, Queen of the United Kingdom; George I, King of the Hellenes; Maria Feodorovna, Empress of Russia

== Children ==
King Christian IX, together with Queen Louise, had six children: Frederick, Alexandra, George, Dagmar, Thyra, and Valdemar. Because of the strained finances and limited fortunes that Christian and Louise had before 1852, they were actively involved in the education of Dagmar and her siblings during that time. Later, from 1875 to 1900, Christian and Louise would annually welcome their children and grandchildren across six different European royal houses at Fredensborg Palace in Denmark.

Within Christian and Louise's family, Thyra was called the "gentle and good daughter" by her father. In addition, Alexandra and Dagmar were respectively seen as the "pretty" and "clever" girls. In contrast, Christian rejected Frederick, then Crown Prince of Denmark, because of their contrasting conservative and reformist mindsets, respectively. Furthermore, Christian had reservations about George becoming King of the Hellenes after the Greek National Assembly elected the latter to be their monarch, seeing the country's throne as a doubtful proposition. Nevertheless, George successfully persuaded his father and assumed the Greek throne in 1863. This influenced Valdemar's decision to decline an offer for the Bulgarian throne in 1878. He did not want to risk going to war with his brother George, given the relations between Bulgaria and Greece at the time.

Family tree of King Christian IX and Queen Louise

Christian IX of Denmark	Louise of Hesse-Kassel
Frederick VIII of Denmark	Louise of Sweden	Alexandra of Denmark	Edward VII of the United Kingdom	George I of Greece	Olga Constantinovna of Russia	Maria Feodorovna (Dagmar of Denmark)	Alexander III of Russia	2 other children
Christian X of Denmark	Haakon VII of Norway	Maud of Wales	George V of the United Kingdom	Constantine I of Greece	Nicholas II of Russia

Children of Christian IX, King of Denmark
Portrait	Name	Birth	Death	Family
Portrait of King Frederick VIII of Denmark	Frederick VIII, King of Denmark r. 1906–1912	3 June 1843	14 May 1912	Married 1869, Princess Louise of Sweden (1851–1926) 8 children (including Christian X, King of Denmark, and Haakon VII, King of Norway)
Portrait of Queen Alexandra of the United Kingdom	Princess Alexandra of Denmark	1 December 1844	20 November 1925	Married 1863, Edward VII, King of the United Kingdom (1841–1910; r. 1901–1910) 6 children (including George V, King of the United Kingdom, and Maud, Queen of Norway)
Portrait of King George I of Greece	George I, King of the Hellenes r. 1863–1913	24 December 1845	18 March 1913	Married 1867, Grand Duchess Olga Constantinovna of Russia (1851–1926) 8 children (including Constantine I, King of the Hellenes)
Portrait of Empress Maria of Russia	Princess Dagmar of Denmark	26 November 1847	13 October 1928	Married 1866, Alexander III, Emperor of Russia (1845–1894; r. 1881–1894) 6 children (including Nicholas II, Emperor of Russia)
Portrait of Crown Princess Thyra of Hanover	Princess Thyra of Denmark	29 September 1853	26 February 1933	Married 1878, Ernest Augustus, Crown Prince of Hanover (1845–1923) 6 children (including Alexandra, Grand Duchess of Mecklenburg-Schwerin, and Ernest Augustus, Duke of Brunswick) (Note: Thyra was also the mother of an illegitimate child.)
Portrait of Prince Valdemar of Denmark	Prince Valdemar of Denmark	27 October 1858	14 January 1939	Married 1885, Princess Marie of Orléans (1865–1909) 5 children

== Grandchildren ==
Christian IX and Louise had 38 grandchildren: eight children of Frederick VIII, six children of Alexandra, seven children of George I, (Note: An eighth child of George I, Olga, died at six months of age.) six children of Dagmar, six children of Thyra, and five children of Valdemar.

=== Children of Frederick VIII and Louise ===
At the age of 17, Princess Louise of Sweden became engaged to King Frederick VIII of Denmark, then called Frederick, Crown Prince of Denmark, at Bäckaskog Castle in Sweden. Frederick and Louise would later marry in 1869 in Stockholm. This marriage took place in the context of a desire for a Scandinavian union in both Denmark and Sweden.

Together, Frederick and Louise had eight children. Two of these children, Christian and Haakon, became King of Denmark and King of Norway, respectively. Frederick and Louise's family came to be defined by Louise's piety. Moreover, Louise oversaw the strictly disciplined education of her children.

Over time, Frederick and Louise's marriage became a reasonably happy one. However, because of Frederick's estrangement from his father, he and his wife kept their distance from his relatives. In addition, Louise had difficult relationships with her in-laws in the Danish royal family.

Children of Frederick VIII, King of Denmark
Portrait	Name	Birth	Death	Family
Portrait of King Christian X of Denmark	Christian X, King of Denmark r. 1912–1947	26 September 1870	20 April 1947	Married 1898, Duchess Alexandrine of Mecklenburg-Schwerin (1879–1952) and had 2 children: Frederik IX, King of Denmark (1899–1972; r. 1947–1972); Father of Margrethe II, Queen of Denmark, and Anne-Marie, Queen of the Hellenes; Knud, Hereditary Prince of Denmark (1900–1976)
Portrait of King Haakon VII of Norway	Haakon VII, King of Norway r. 1905–1957	3 August 1872	21 September 1957	Married 1896, Princess Maud of Wales (1869–1938) and had 1 child: Olav V, King of Norway (1903–1991; r. 1957–1991); Father of Harald V, King of Norway
Portrait of Princess Louise of Denmark	Princess Louise of Denmark	17 February 1875	4 April 1906	Married 1896, Prince Frederick of Schaumburg-Lippe (1868–1945) and had 3 children: Princess Marie Louise of Schaumburg-Lippe (1897–1938); Prince Christian of Schaumburg-Lippe (1898–1974); Princess Stephanie of Schaumburg-Lippe (1899–1925)
Portrait of Prince Harald of Denmark	Prince Harald of Denmark	8 October 1876	30 March 1949	Married 1909, Princess Helena Adelaide of Schleswig-Holstein-Sonderburg-Glücksburg (1888–1962) and had 5 children: Princess Feodora of Denmark (1910–1975); Princess Caroline-Mathilde of Denmark (1912–1995); Princess Alexandrine-Louise of Denmark (1914–1962); Prince Gorm of Denmark (1919–1992); Prince Oluf of Denmark (1923–1990)
Portrait of Princess Ingeborg of Denmark	Princess Ingeborg of Denmark	2 August 1878	12 March 1958	Married 1897, Prince Carl, Duke of Västergötland (1861–1951) and had 4 children: Princess Margaretha of Sweden (1899–1977); Märtha, Crown Princess of Norway (1901–1954); Mother of Harald V, King of Norway; Astrid, Queen of the Belgians (1905–1935); Mother of Joséphine-Charlotte, Grand Duchess of Luxembourg, Baudouin, King of the Belgians, and Albert II, King of the Belgians; Prince Carl, Duke of Östergötland (1911–2003)
Portrait of Princess Thyra of Denmark	Princess Thyra of Denmark	14 March 1880	2 November 1945	Died unmarried
Portrait of Princess Thyra of Denmark	Prince Gustav of Denmark	4 March 1887	5 October 1944	Died unmarried
Coat of arms representing Princess Dagmar of Denmark	Princess Dagmar of Denmark	23 May 1890	11 October 1961	Married 1922, Jørgen Castenskjold (1893–1978) and had 4 children, including: Christian Ludwig Castenskjold (1926–2024); Jørgen Castenskjold (1929–1964)

=== Children of Alexandra and Edward VII ===
In 1861, Princess Alexandra met King Edward VII of the United Kingdom, then called Albert Edward Prince of Wales, at the Speyer Cathedral in Germany. Edward was the eldest son of Queen Victoria and Prince Albert. Edward later proposed to Alexandra in 1862, and they married in 1863 at St George's Chapel in Windsor Castle in the United Kingdom.

Although Alexandra and Edward got along fairly well, Edward engaged in several affairs during their marriage. However, for the most part, Alexandra did not pay attention to her husband's romantic liaisons.

Together, Alexandra and Edward had six children. One of these children, Alexander John, died in infancy. Furthermore, Alexandra and Edward's eldest son, Albert Victor, died in 1892 after contracting an illness during a flu pandemic. Albert Victor's death devastated Alexandra.

The three daughters of Edward and Alexandra, Louise, Victoria, and Maud, were known for being active during their youth. As the daughters aged, they became more withdrawn. Alexandra did not want Louise, Victoria, and Maud to marry because her daughters had two brothers who could potentially follow Edward to the British throne. However, both Louise and Maud eventually married.

Portrait of Queen Alexandra and King Edward VII's family

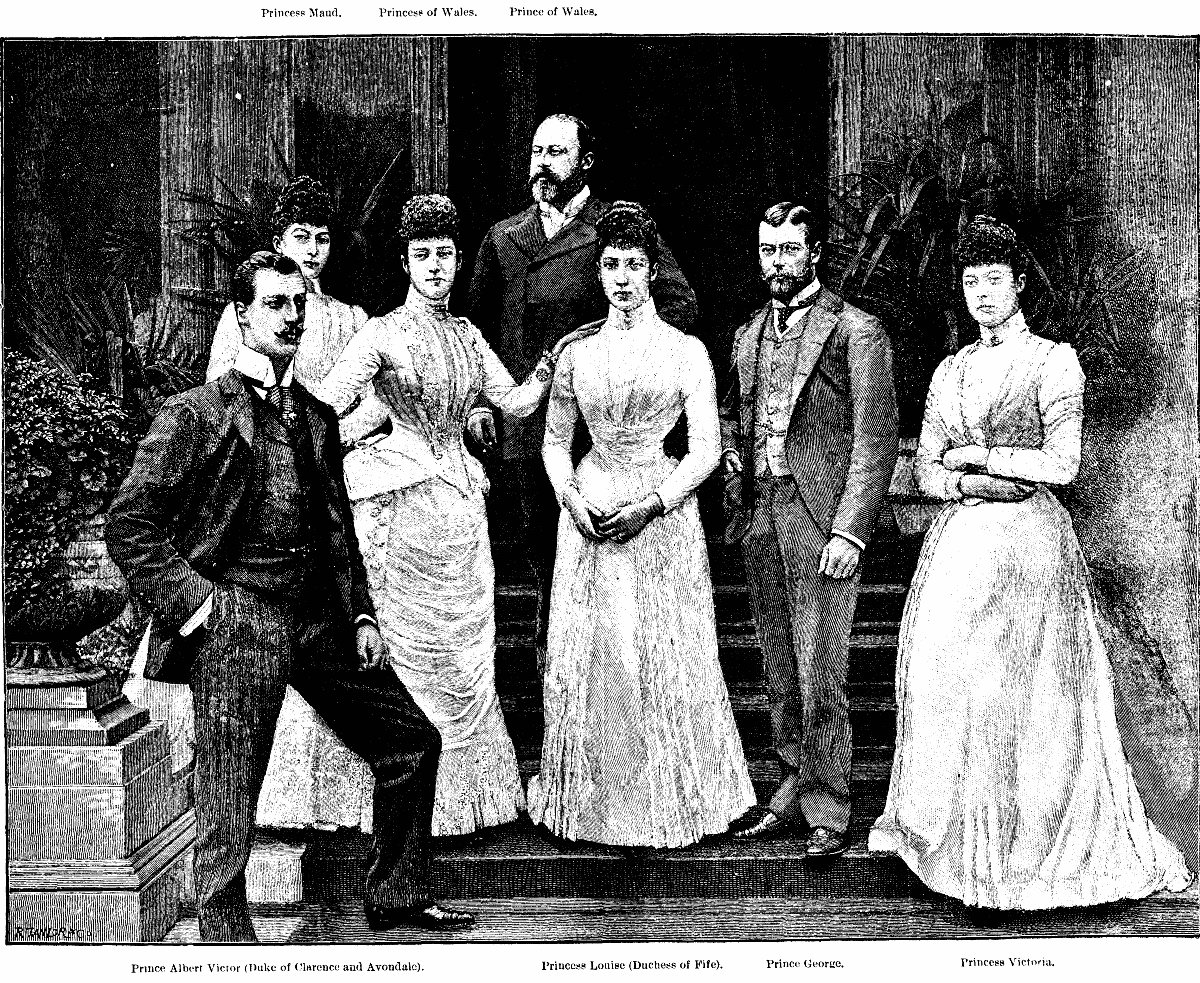
From left to right: Prince Albert Victor, Duke of Clarence and Avondale, Maud, Queen of Norway, Alexandra, Queen of the United Kingdom, Edward VII, King of the United Kingdom, Louise, Princess Royal and Duchess of Fife, George V, King of the United Kingdom, and Princess Victoria of the United Kingdom

Family tree of King Edward VII, Queen Alexandra, and their royal descendants

Edward VII of the United Kingdom	Alexandra of Denmark
Prince Albert Victor, Duke of Clarence and Avondale	Mary of Teck	George V of the United Kingdom	2 other children (Note: A sixth child of Alexandra, Alexander John, died in infancy.)	Haakon VII of Norway	Maud of Wales
Edward VIII of the United Kingdom	George VI of the United Kingdom	4 other children	Olav V of Norway
Elizabeth II of the United Kingdom	Harald V of Norway
Charles III of the United Kingdom	Haakon VIII of Norway
William, Prince of Wales	Ingrid Alexandra, Crown Princess of Norway
Prince George of Wales

Children of Alexandra, Queen of the United Kingdom
Portrait	Name	Birth	Death	Family
Portrait of Prince Albert Victor of the United Kingdom	Prince Albert Victor, Duke of Clarence and Avondale	8 January 1864	14 January 1892	Died unmarried
Portrait of King George V of the United Kingdom	George V, King of the United Kingdom r. 1910–1936	3 June 1865	20 January 1936	Married 1893, Princess Victoria Mary of Teck (1867–1953) and had 6 children: Edward VIII, King of the United Kingdom (1894–1972; r. 1936); George VI, King of the United Kingdom (1895–1952; r. 1936–1952); Father of Elizabeth II, Queen of the United Kingdom; Mary, Princess Royal (1897–1965); Prince Henry, Duke of Gloucester (1900–1974); Prince George, Duke of Kent (1902–1942); Prince John of the United Kingdom (1905–1919)
Portrait of Princess Louise of the United Kingdom	Louise, Princess Royal	20 February 1867	4 January 1931	Married 1889, Alexander Duff, 1st Duke of Fife (1849–1912), and had 3 children: Alistair Duff, Marquess of Macduff (1890–1890); Princess Alexandra, 2nd Duchess of Fife (1891–1959); Princess Maud of the United Kingdom (1893–1945)
Portrait of Princess Victoria of the United Kingdom	Princess Victoria of the United Kingdom	6 July 1868	3 December 1935	Died unmarried
Portrait of Queen Maud of Norway	Princess Maud of Wales	26 November 1869	20 November 1938	Married 1896, Haakon VII, King of Norway (1872–1957; r. 1905–1957), and had 1 child: Olav V, King of Norway (1903–1991; r. 1957–1991); Father of Harald V, King of Norway
Coat of arms representing Prince Alexander John of the United Kingdom	Prince Alexander John of Wales	6 April 1871	7 April 1871	

=== Children of George I and Olga ===
In 1863, the Kingdom of Greece was without a monarch. The royal houses of Europe believed that George I, then Prince William of Denmark, would be a suitable candidate for the Greek throne. Consequently, George traveled to Greece, a country that he had never visited before, that same year to start his reign.

After arriving in Greece, George married Grand Duchess Olga Constantinovna of Russia in 1867. George and Olga had eight children together.

Family tree of King George I and Queen Olga

		George I of Greece		Olga Constantinovna of Russia
Constantine I of Greece	Sophia of Prussia		Prince George of Greece and Denmark		6 other children

Children of George I, King of the Hellenes
Portrait	Name	Birth	Death	Family
Portrait of King Constantine I of Greece	Constantine I, King of the Hellenes r. 1913–1917, 1920–1922	2 August 1868	11 January 1923	Married 1889, Princess Sophia of Prussia (1870–1932) and had 6 children: George II, King of the Hellenes (1890–1947; r. 1922–1924, 1935–1947); Alexander, King of the Hellenes (1893–1920; r. 1917–1920); Father of Alexandra, Queen of Yugoslavia; Helen, Queen Mother of Romania (1896–1982); Mother of Michael I, King of Romania; Paul, King of the Hellenes (1901–1964; r. 1947–1964); Father of Sofía, Queen of Spain, and Constantine II, King of the Hellenes; Princess Irene of Greece and Denmark (1904–1974); Princess Katherine of Greece and Denmark (1913–2007)
Portrait of Prince George of Greece	Prince George of Greece and Denmark	24 June 1869	25 November 1957	Married 1907, Marie Bonaparte (1882–1962) and had 2 children: Prince Peter of Greece and Denmark (1908–1980); Princess Eugénie of Greece and Denmark (1910–1989)
Portrait of Princess Alexandra of Greece	Princess Alexandra of Greece and Denmark	18 August 1870	21 September 1891	Married 1889, Grand Duke Paul Alexandrovich of Russia (1860–1919) and had 2 children: Grand Duchess Maria Pavlovna of Russia (1890–1958); Grand Duke Dmitri Pavlovich of Russia (1891–1942)
Portrait of Prince Nicholas of Greece	Prince Nicholas of Greece and Denmark	22 January 1872	8 February 1938	Married 1902, Grand Duchess Elena Vladimirovna of Russia (1882–1957) and had 3 children: Princess Olga of Greece and Denmark (1903–1997); Princess Elizabeth of Greece and Denmark (1904–1955); Princess Marina of Greece and Denmark (1906–1968)
Portrait of Princess Maria of Greece	Princess Maria of Greece and Denmark	3 March 1876	14 December 1940	Married 1900 (1), Grand Duke George Mikhailovich of Russia (1863–1919) and had 2 children: Princess Nina Georgievna of Russia (1901–1974); Princess Xenia Georgievna of Russia (1903–1965)
Portrait of Princess Maria of Greece	Princess Maria of Greece and Denmark	3 March 1876	14 December 1940	Married 1922 (2), Admiral Perikles Ioannidis (1881–1965) and had no children
Coat of arms representing Princess Olga of Greece	Princess Olga of Greece and Denmark	7 April 1880	2 November 1880	
Portrait of Prince Andrew of Greece	Prince Andrew of Greece and Denmark	2 February 1882	3 December 1944	Married 1903, Princess Alice of Battenberg (1885–1969) and had 5 children: Princess Margarita of Greece and Denmark (1905–1981); Princess Theodora of Greece and Denmark (1906–1969); Princess Cecilie of Greece and Denmark (1911–1937); Princess Sophie of Greece and Denmark (1914–2001); Prince Philip of Greece and Denmark (1921–2021); Father of Charles III, King of the United Kingdom
Portrait of Prince Christopher of Greece	Prince Christopher of Greece and Denmark	10 August 1888	21 January 1940	Married 1920 (1), Nonie May Stewart (1878–1923) and had no children
Portrait of Prince Christopher of Greece	Prince Christopher of Greece and Denmark	10 August 1888	21 January 1940	Married 1929 (2), Princess Françoise of Orléans (1902–1953) and had 1 child: Prince Michael of Greece and Denmark (1939–2024)

=== Children of Dagmar and Alexander III ===
Queen Louise, Dagmar's mother, hoped to find a suitable husband for her daughter in the Russian imperial court. Following the marriage of Dagmar's sister Alexandra, Queen Louise dedicated her enthusiasm to making this desire a reality. Eventually, in 1864, Dagmar became engaged to Nicholas Alexandrovich, the then-heir to the Russian throne. However, he died one year later.

While on his deathbed, Nicholas insisted that his brother, Emperor Alexander III of Russia (then called Grand Duke Alexander Alexandrovich of Russia), marry Dagmar. Dagmar gradually developed a romantic attraction toward Alexander. They married in October 1866, and Dagmar took the name Maria Feodorovna after converting to Russian Orthodoxy.

Maria and Alexander would go on to have six children together, one of whom, Alexander, did not survive past infancy. Maria adored and spoiled her surviving children, especially Nicholas. Likewise, Alexander adored his daughters.

Of the five children of Maria and Alexander who survived past infancy, George died of tuberculosis. Moreover, Nicholas, Michael, and the former's five children were killed during the Russian Revolution.

Portrait of Emperor Alexander III and Empress Maria's family

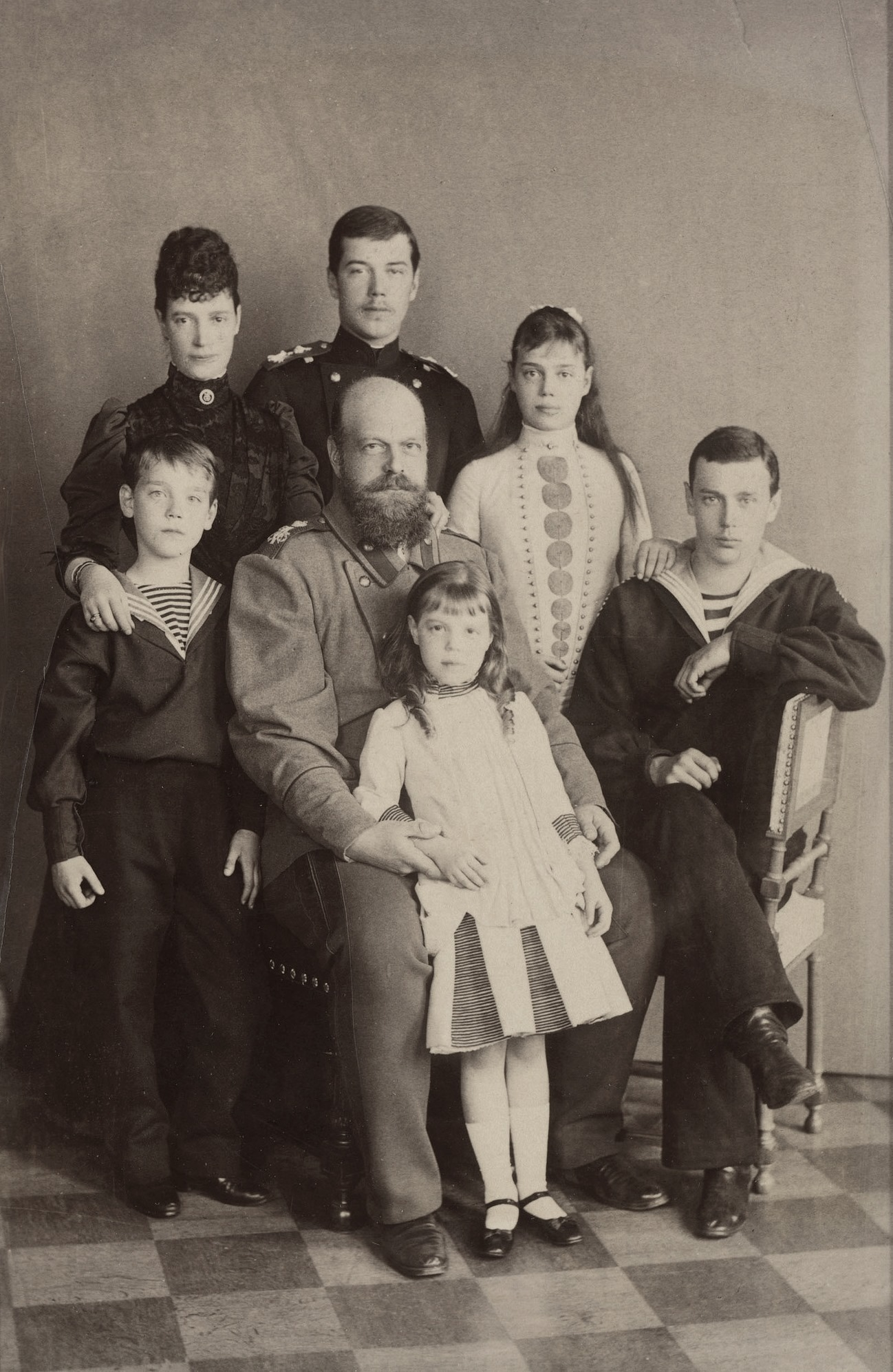
Back row, from left to right: Maria Feodorovna, Empress of Russia, Nicholas II, Emperor of Russia, and Grand Duchess Xenia Alexandrovna of Russia Front row, from left to right: Grand Duke Michael Alexandrovich of Russia, Alexander III, Emperor of Russia, Grand Duchess Olga Alexandrovna of Russia, and Grand Duke George Alexandrovich of Russia

Family tree of Emperor Alexander III and Empress Maria (Note: A sixth child of Maria, Alexander, did not survive past infancy.)

Alexander III of Russia	Maria Feodorovna (Dagmar of Denmark)
Nicholas II of Russia	Alexandra Feodorovna (Alix of Hesse)	Grand Duke George Alexandrovich of Russia	Grand Duchess Xenia Alexandrovna of Russia	Grand Duke Michael Alexandrovich of Russia	Grand Duchess Olga Alexandrovna of Russia
Grand Duchess Olga Nikolaevna of Russia	Grand Duchess Tatiana Nikolaevna of Russia	Grand Duchess Maria Nikolaevna of Russia	Grand Duchess Anastasia Nikolaevna of Russia	Alexei Nikolaevich, Tsarevich of Russia

Children of Maria Feodorovna, Empress of Russia
Portrait	Name	Birth	Death	Family
Portrait of Emperor Nicholas II of Russia	Nicholas II, Emperor of Russia r. 1894–1917	18 May 1868	17 July 1918	Married 1894, Princess Alix of Hesse and by Rhine (1872–1918) and had 5 children: Grand Duchess Olga Nikolaevna of Russia (1895–1918); Grand Duchess Tatiana Nikolaevna of Russia (1897–1918); Grand Duchess Maria Nikolaevna of Russia (1899–1918); Grand Duchess Anastasia Nikolaevna of Russia (1901–1918); Alexei Nikolaevich, Tsarevich of Russia (1904–1918)
Coat of arms representing Grand Duke Alexander of Russia	Grand Duke Alexander Alexandrovich of Russia	7 June 1869	2 May 1870	
Portrait of Grand Duke George of Russia	Grand Duke George Alexandrovich of Russia	9 May 1871	9 August 1899	Died unmarried
Coat of arms representing Grand Duchess Xenia of Russia	Grand Duchess Xenia Alexandrovna of Russia	6 April 1875	20 April 1960	Married 1894, Grand Duke Alexander Mikhailovich of Russia (1866–1933) and had 7 children: Princess Irina Alexandrovna of Russia (1895–1970); Prince Andrei Alexandrovich of Russia (1897–1981); Prince Feodor Alexandrovich of Russia (1898–1968); Prince Nikita Alexandrovich of Russia (1900–1974); Prince Dmitri Alexandrovich of Russia (1901–1980); Prince Rostislav Alexandrovich of Russia (1902–1978); Prince Vasili Alexandrovich of Russia (1907–1989)
Portrait of Grand Duke Michael of Russia	Grand Duke Michael Alexandrovich of Russia	4 December 1878	between 18 and 28 July 1918	Married 1911, Natalia Brasova (1880–1952) and had 1 child: George Mikhailovich, Count Brasov (1910–1931)
Portrait of Grand Duchess Olga of Russia	Grand Duchess Olga Alexandrovna of Russia	13 June 1882	24 November 1960	Married 1901 (1), Duke Peter Alexandrovich of Oldenburg (1868–1924) (Note: Olga and Peter's marriage was annulled.) and had no children
Portrait of Grand Duchess Olga of Russia	Grand Duchess Olga Alexandrovna of Russia	13 June 1882	24 November 1960	Married 1916 (2), Nikolai Alexandrovich Kulikovsky (1881–1958) and had 2 children: Tikhon Nikolaevich (1917–1993); Guri Nikolaevich (1919–1984)

=== Children of Thyra and Ernest Augustus ===
Finding a suitable husband for Princess Thyra of Denmark was an undertaking for her mother, Queen Louise, who had one potential suitor in mind for Thyra: Prince Ernest Augustus, Duke of Cumberland. Eventually, Thyra married him, which gave her the desired opportunity to have children.

Together, Thyra and Ernest Augustus had six children. Living in Gmunden, Austria, Thyra enjoyed a quiet life which allowed her to spend time with her children. However, two of her sons died at a young age. Prince George William died in a car accident on the way to the funeral of his uncle King Frederick VIII of Denmark, and Prince Christian died of appendicitis.

Portrait of Princess Thyra and Prince Ernest Augustus's family

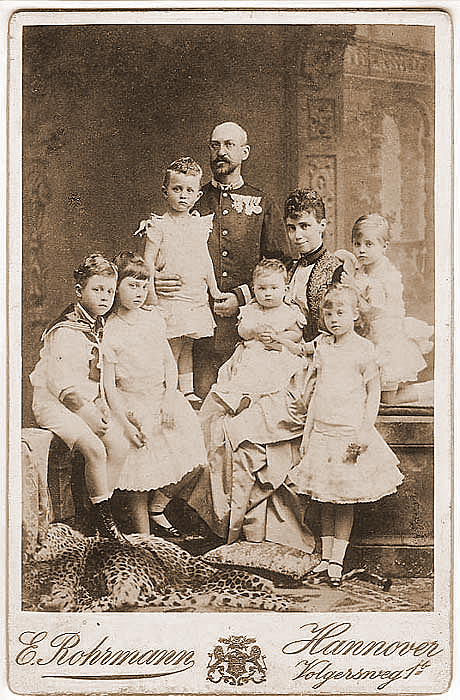
Pictured: Prince George William, Princess Marie Louise, Prince Christian with Crown Prince Ernest Augustus, Crown Princess Thyra holding Prince Ernest Augustus, Princess Alexandra and Princess Olga

Children of Thyra, Crown Princess of Hanover
Portrait	Name	Birth	Death	Family
Portrait of Princess Marie Louise of Hanover	Princess Marie Louise of Hanover and Cumberland	11 October 1879	31 January 1948	Married 1900, Prince Maximilian of Baden (1867–1929) and had 2 children: Princess Marie Alexandra of Baden (1902–1944); Berthold, Margrave of Baden (1906–1963)
Coat of arms representing Prince George William of Hanover	Prince George William of Hanover and Cumberland	28 October 1880	20 May 1912	Died unmarried
Portrait of Grand Duchess Alexandra of Mecklenburg-Schwerin	Princess Alexandra of Hanover and Cumberland	29 September 1882	30 August 1963	Married 1904, Frederick Francis IV, Grand Duke of Mecklenburg-Schwerin (1882–1945; r. 1897–1918), and had 5 children: Friedrich Franz, Hereditary Grand Duke of Mecklenburg-Schwerin (1910–2001); Duke Christian Louis of Mecklenburg-Schwerin (1912–1996); Duchess Olga of Mecklenburg-Schwerin (1916–1917); Duchess Thyra of Mecklenburg-Schwerin (1919–1981); Duchess Anastasia of Mecklenburg-Schwerin (1922–1979)
	Princess Olga of Hanover and Cumberland	11 July 1884	21 September 1958	Died unmarried
Coat of arms representing Prince Christian of Hanover	Prince Christian of Hanover and Cumberland	4 July 1885	3 September 1901	
Coat of arms representing Duke Ernest Augustus of Brunswick	Ernest Augustus, Duke of Brunswick r. 1913–1918	17 November 1887	30 January 1953	Married 1913, Princess Victoria Louise of Prussia (1892–1980) and had 5 children: Ernest Augustus, Hereditary Prince of Brunswick (1914–1987); Prince George William of Hanover (1915–2006); Frederica, Queen of the Hellenes (1917–1981); Mother of Sofía, Queen of Spain, and Constantine II, King of the Hellenes; Prince Christian Oscar of Hanover (1919–1981); Prince Welf Henry of Hanover (1923–1997)

=== Children of Valdemar and Marie ===
In 1885, Prince Valdemar of Denmark married Marie of Orléans, a French princess. Together, they had five children who were nicknamed the "naughty children from the Yellow Palace". Nevertheless, both Valdemar and Marie were very popular in Denmark.

Because of Valdemar's interest in ships, he went on long sea voyages, a practice that continued during his marriage to Marie.

Children of Prince Valdemar of Denmark
Portrait	Name	Birth	Death	Family
Portrait of Prince Aage of Denmark	Prince Aage of Denmark	10 June 1887	29 February 1940	Married 1914, Mathilde Calvi dei conti di Bergolo (1885–1949) and had 1 child: Valdemar, Count of Rosenborg (1915–1995)
Portrait of Prince Axel of Denmark	Prince Axel of Denmark	12 August 1888	14 July 1964	Married 1919, Princess Margaretha of Sweden (1899–1977) and had 2 children: Prince George of Denmark (1920–1986); Prince Flemming of Denmark (1922–2002)
Portrait of Prince Erik of Denmark	Prince Erik of Denmark	8 November 1890	11 September 1950	Married 1924, Lois Frances Booth (1897–1941) (Note: Erik and Lois's marriage ended in 1937.) and had 2 children: Countess Alexandra of Rosenborg (1927–1992); Count Christian of Rosenborg (1932–1997)
Portrait of Prince Viggo of Denmark	Prince Viggo of Denmark	25 December 1893	4 January 1970	Married 1924, Eleanor Margaret Green (1895–1966) and had no children
Portrait of Princess Margaret of Denmark	Princess Margaret of Denmark	17 September 1895	18 September 1992	Married 1921, Prince René of Bourbon-Parma (1894–1962) and had 4 children: Prince Jacques of Bourbon-Parma (1922–1964); Princess Anne of Bourbon-Parma (1923–2016); Spouse of Michael I, King of Romania; Prince Michel of Bourbon-Parma (1926–2018); Prince André of Bourbon-Parma (1928–2011)

== See also ==
- John William Friso – Another European prince with descendants in multiple royal families
- Louis IX of Hesse-Darmstadt – Another European sovereign with descendants in multiple royal families
- Descendants of Miguel I of Portugal – Describes progeny of another European king whose descendants married into multiple royal families
- Nicholas I of Montenegro – Another European king whose descendants married into multiple royal families
- Descendants of Paul I of Russia – Describes progeny of a European emperor with descendants in multiple royal families
- Descendants of Queen Victoria – Describes progeny of one of Christian IX's contemporaries
  - Royal descendants of Queen Victoria and of King Christian IX

== Footnotes ==
=== References ===
- Atchinson, Bob (n.d.). "Grand Duchess Olga Alexandrovna". Alexander Palace Time Machine. Bob Atchinson.
- Rodriguez, Blanca; Warner, Alex (31 December 2019). "All the Royals With (Rumored) Illegitimate Children". Marie Claire.
- TIME (26 July 1937). "Milestones, Jul. 26, 1937". TIME.
