= The Family of Christian IX of Denmark =

Painting by Laurits Tuxen

- Christian IX med sin familie (Danish)
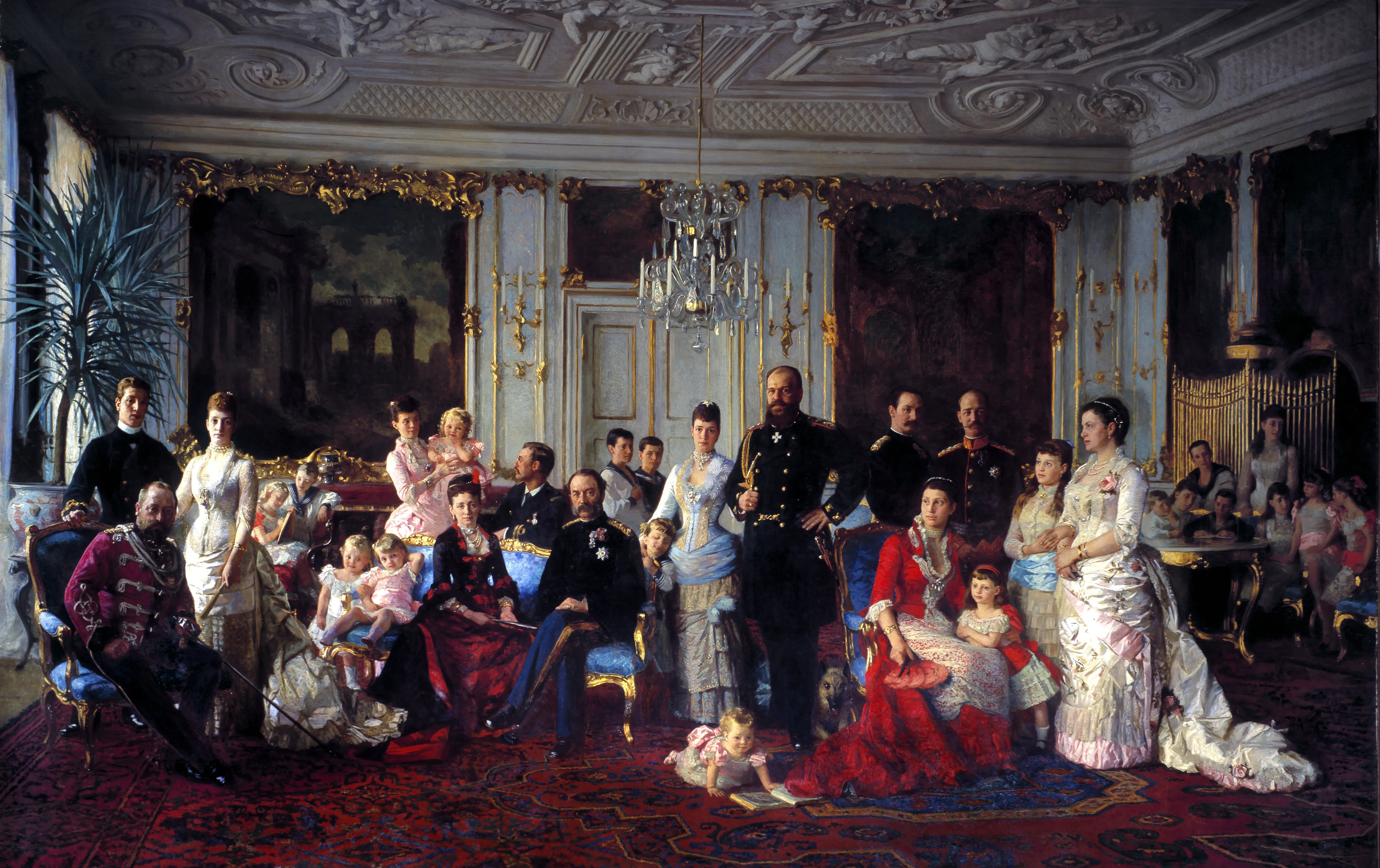
- Artist: Laurits Tuxen
- Year: 1886
- Medium: Oil on canvas
- Dimensions: 500 cm × 700 cm (200 in × 280 in)

The Family of Christian IX of Denmark is a monumental oil on canvas group portrait painting by Laurits Tuxen of Christian IX of Denmark and his family of European royalty, gathered in the Garden Hall at Fredensborg Palace. The painting is on display in one of the Queen's Reception Rooms at Christiansborg Palace. A reduced copy of the painting hangs in Amalienborg Palace.

== Background ==
Christian IX's six children with Queen Louise married into other European royal families, earning him the sobriquet "the father-in-law of Europe". It was for a while a tradition for them to gather at Fredensborg Palace some time during the summer, bringing their spouses and numerous offspring. These summer days spent together were known as the "Fredensborg days".

== Production ==
The painting was Tuxen's first royal commission. Tuxen stayed at Fredensborg Palace during the Fredensborg Days of 1883–86 to familiarize himself with the appearances of the royal models, but they did not pose together for the painting. The painting was instead based on photographs and portrait studies of the models arranged in smaller groups, which were subsequently composed into the final painting. Christian IX and Queen Louise were photographed at Amalienborg Palace, while most of the other royalty were photographed in the garden hall at Fredensborg Palace. He also visited the foreign models at their residences in England, Greece and Russia. It took him three years to complete the painting.

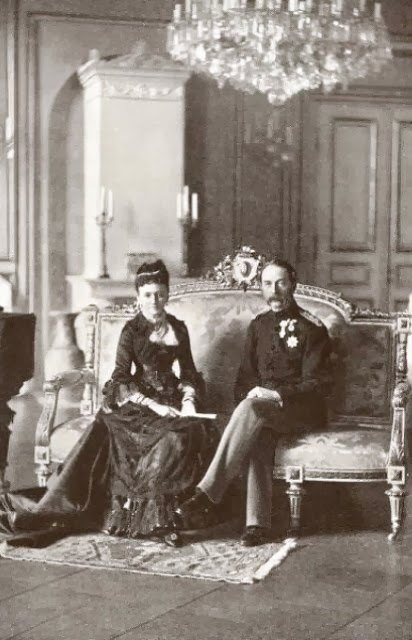
Reference photo of Christian IX and Queen Louise

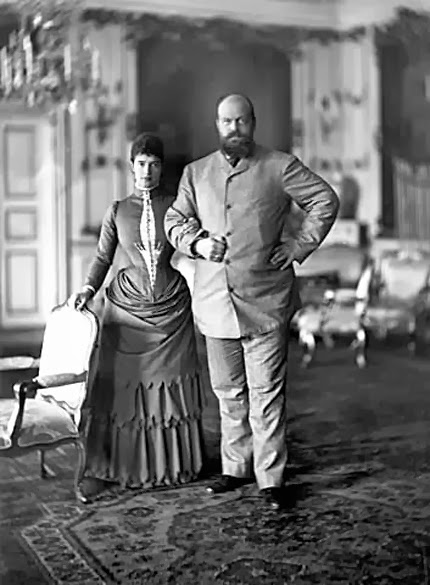
Reference photograph of the Russian Imperial couple

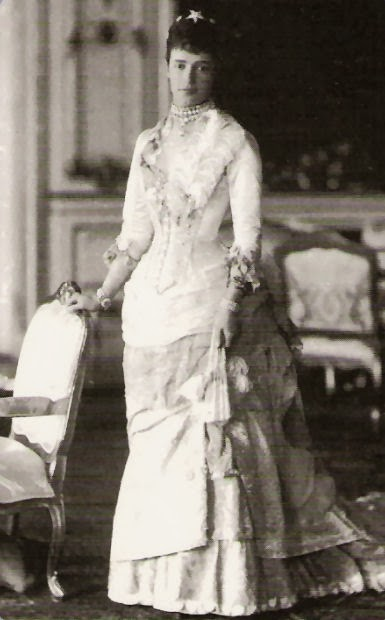
Reference photograph of Empress Maria Feodorovna

== Description ==
Christian IX and Queen Louise are seen seated on a sofa in the centre of the picture. The subjects are placed according to rank, the foremost in the front and in the middle of the picture.

=== People seen in the picture ===
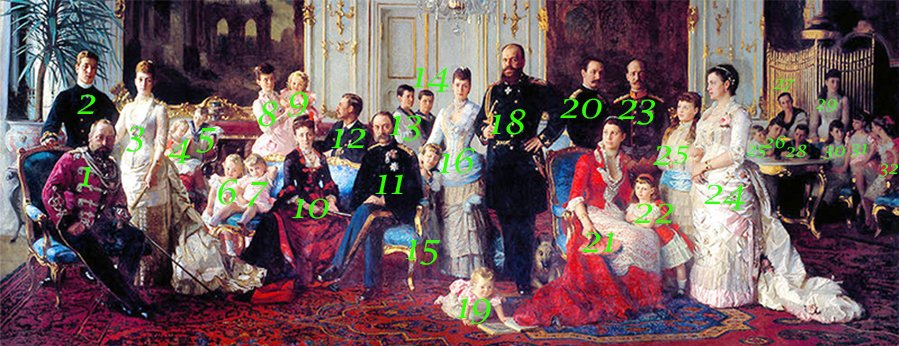
The 32 people seen in the painting (Note: Due to a numbering error, there is no one numbered 17, but two people are numbered as 25: Princesses Alexandra and Marie of Greece and Denmark.)

From left to right: 1. The Prince of Wales (later Edward VII of Great Britain)
2. Prince Albert Victor, Duke of Clarence and Avondale
3. The Princess of Wales (later Queen Alexandra of Great Britain)
4. Princess Ingeborg of Denmark
5. Prince Harald of Denmark
6. Prince Georg of Cumberland
7. Princess Marie of Cumberland
8. Princess Thyra, Duchess of Cumberland
9. Princess Alexandra of Cumberland
10. Queen Louise of Denmark
11. Christian IX of Denmark
12. Prince Valdemar of Denmark
13. Prince Christian (later Christian X)
14. Nicholas Alexandrovich, Tsarevich of Russia (later Tsar Nicholas II)
15. Grand Duke Michael Alexandrovich of Russia
16. Tsarina Maria Feodorovna of Russia
18. Tsar Alexander III of Russia
19. Grand Duchess Olga Alexandrovna of Russia
20. Frederik, Crown Prince of Denmark (later Frederik VIII)
21. Louise, Crown Princess of Denmark (later Queen Louise)
22. Princess Thyra of Denmark
23. King George I of Greece (born Prince Wilhelm of Denmark)
24. Queen Olga of Greece
25. Princess Alexandra of Greece
25. Princess Marie of Greece
26. Princess Louise of Wales (later Princess Royal)
27. Prince Carl of Denmark (later Haakon VII of Norway)
28. Grand Duke George Alexandrovich of Russia
29. Princess Victoria of Wales
30. Princess Maud of Wales (later Queen Maud of Norway)
31. Grand Duchess Xenia Alexandrovna of Russia
32. Princess Louise of Denmark

== Exhibition and preliminary works ==
The painting is on display in one of the Queen's Reception Rooms at Christiansborg Palace.

Tuxen painted several reduced versions of the painting with some variations. He also painted some portrait studies and other preliminary sketches, some of which were afterwards worked up as proper works in themselves. One of the reduced versions of the painting hangs in Amalienborg Palace. A portrait study of Crown Princess Louise is on display in Sønderborg Castle. It was acquired by the Ny Carlsberg Foundation and presented to the museum in 1939.

Tuxen's painting has also served as an inspiration for Thomas Klugge's group portrait painting of The Family of Margrethe II of Denmark.

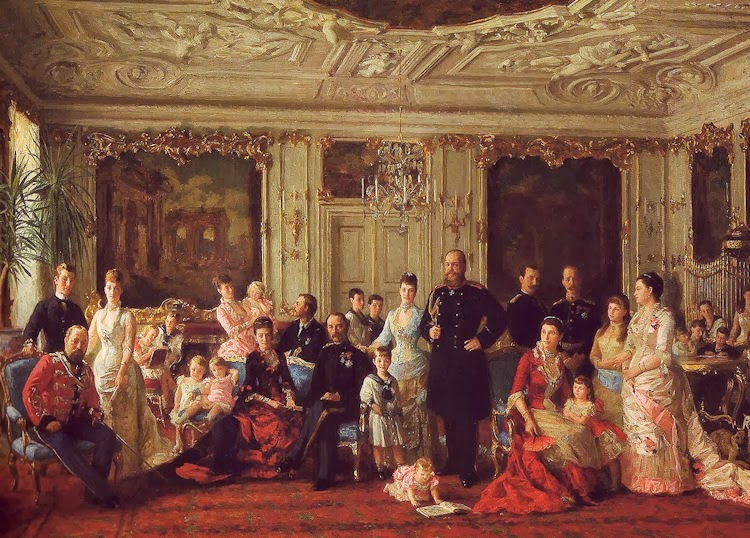
Reduced version of the painting (notice that Grand Duke Mikhail, in the center of the painting, is in a different position from in the original)

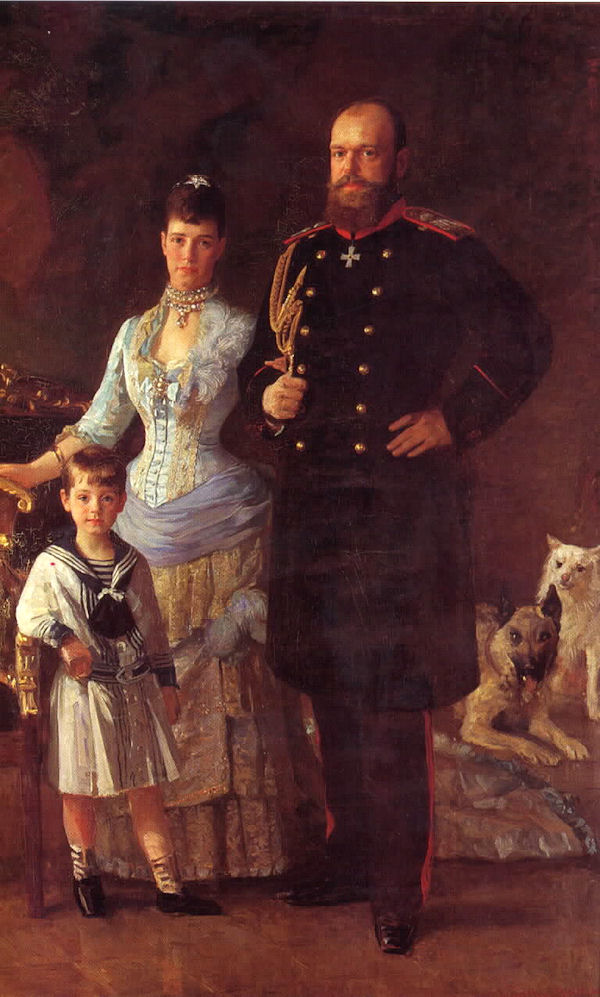
The Russian Imperial couple and their youngest son Mikhail

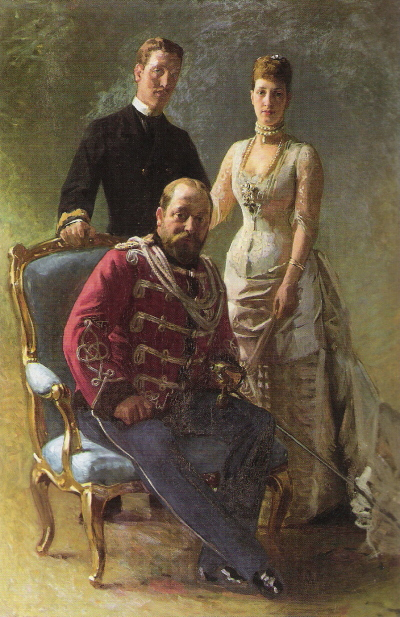
Edward, Prince of Wales, with his wife Princess Alexandra and son Prince Albert Victor

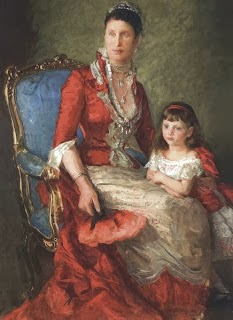
Crown Princess Louise with her daughter Thyra, now in Sønderborg Castle
