= Natalia Brasova =

Russian noblewoman

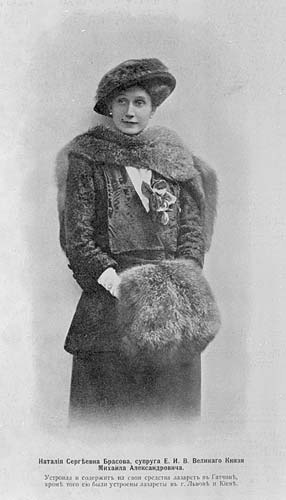
- World War I postcard of Brasova. The caption states that she established military hospitals in Gatchina, Lvov and Kiev with her own money.
- Born: 27 June 1880; Perovo, Moscow, Russian Empire
- Died: 23 January 1952 (aged 71); Laënnec charity hospital, Paris, France
- Burial: Passy Cemetery, Paris, France
- Spouse: Sergei Mamontov (m. 1902; div. 1905) Vladimir Wulfert (m. 1905; div. 1910) Grand Duke Michael Alexandrovich of Russia (m. 1912; died 1918)
- Issue: Natalia Sergeyevna Mamontova; George Mikhailovich, Count Brasov
- Father: Sergei Alexandrovich Sheremetevsky
- Mother: Julia Vyacheslavovna Sventitskaya

Natalia Brasova, Countess Brasova (Russian: Наталья Брасова; born Natalia Sergeyevna Sheremetyevskaya, Russian: Ната́лья Серге́евна Шереме́тьевская; 27 June 1880 – 23 January 1952) was a Russian noblewoman who married, as her third husband, Grand Duke Michael Alexandrovich of Russia.

== Early life ==
Natalia, or Natasha to her friends, was the youngest of three daughters of a Moscow lawyer, Sergei Alexandrovich Sheremetevsky. She was born at a rented summer dacha at Perovo, on the outskirts of Moscow. Sheremetevsky employed 11 other lawyers, and was a member of the minor Russian nobility, but had no title and was essentially a professional middle-class man. He was a sometime deputy in the Moscow City Duma, and a trustee of the Arbat City School. In the first year of her life, Natalia and her family lived in a rented apartment near the Moscow Kremlin on Ilinka. Their landlord, wealthy industrialist Aleksey Khludov, was also Natalia's godfather. From 1881 to 1893, the family lived at 7 Serebriany Lane, a single-storied wooden house owned by Sheremetevsky. From 1893, the family lived in a succession of rented apartments until Natalia left home on her marriage. She was educated at a private school, and by a French governess employed by her father.

== First marriage ==
In 1902, she married Sergei Mamontov (1 October 1877, Moscow – 30 December 1939, Tallinn), a nephew of Savva Mamontov. Sergei was a rehearsal accompanist for Savva Mamontov's Opera Company, which was renamed Association of Russian Opera after Savva's bankruptcy in 1899, and later at the Bolshoi Theatre. Through her first husband's connections, Natalia became friendly with noted musicians such as Sergei Rachmaninoff and Feodor Chaliapin. The couple moved into 13 Mansurovsky Lane, a new apartment building near the fashionable Prechistenka Street, and had a daughter, Natalia or "Tata" to the family, on 2 June 1903. Sergei had a stammer and was of a retiring disposition, but Natalia was keen to socialise. Finding him socially dull, she began to go out unaccompanied by her husband. Russian divorce law followed the teachings of the Eastern Orthodox Church, and in practice divorce was only possible in cases of adultery where the husband was the guilty party. In 1905, Sergei agreed to a divorce and to act in the proceedings as if he was the unfaithful partner. Now free from her first husband, Natalia married her lover, cavalry officer Vladimir Vladimirovich Wulfert (Russian: Вульферт).

== Second marriage ==
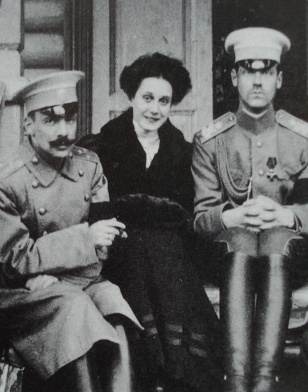
Natalia between Wulfert (left) and Grand Duke Michael Alexandrovich of Russia (right)

Natalia and Wulfert had known each other as children, but only fell in love after re-meeting in Moscow when Wulfert was on leave. He was an army officer serving in The Dowager Empress's Life Guard Cuirassier Regiment, known as the Blue Cuirassiers from the colour of their uniforms, stationed at Gatchina near Saint Petersburg. Natalia and Wulfert set up home at 7 Baggout Street, Gatchina.

In early December 1907, Natalia was introduced to one of her husband's fellow officers in the Blue Cuirassiers: Grand Duke Michael Alexandrovich of Russia, the brother of Tsar Nicholas II. The following month, they met again at the Regimental Winter Ball. From then on, they began to see each other regularly, though Michael was always careful to include Wulfert in his letters and invitations, at least until October 1908, and use the formal form of "you" (vy) rather than the familiar one (ty). Rumours of their affair spread through the regiment, and Wulfert grew resentful. Michael began sending her secret letters to a separate postal address, now writing to her in familiar terms, and Wulfert grew physically violent, as Natalia refused to share his bed. In July 1909, privately in a letter, she accused her husband of rape. She packed luggage, and with her daughter, an elderly female cousin, and two maids, she left Wulfert for a break abroad in Switzerland. Both Michael and Wulfert turned up at the train station to see her off, and Wulfert created a scene by loudly accusing her of ruining him.

Through Baron Frederiks, the court minister, Michael tried to buy off Wulfert by offering him a post in Moscow as aide-de-camp to Prince Odoevsky-Maslov at the Kremlin. Wulfert threatened to commit suicide if Natalia did not return to him, and then challenged Michael to a duel. Nicholas II intervened, and transferred Michael from the Blue Cuirassiers to the Chernigov Hussars at Orel, 650 miles (1,050 kilometres) from Saint Petersburg. In August 1909, Michael went to Denmark with his mother, and arranged for Natalia to meet him there. They were reunited in a hotel in Copenhagen, unbeknownst to his mother, and consummated their relationship for the first time.

== Royal mistress ==
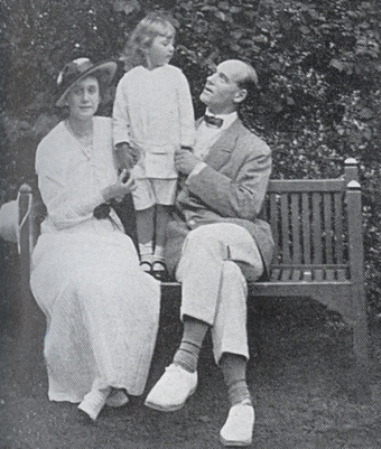
Natalia and Grand Duke Michael Alexandrovich with their son

Wulfert accepted the Kremlin post, at an enlarged salary, and as Natalia's residence permit was tied to her husband's she also returned to Moscow to live temporarily at a hotel opposite the Kremlin. By November, she was living in an eight-room apartment at 36 Petersburg Road, paid for by Michael, where he visited her about three times a month from Orel. Wulfert was still demanding that Natalia return to him, as well as threatening to shoot her. Against the wishes of Michael and Natalia, Nicholas II insisted that she remain in Moscow, and refused to vary the conditions of her residence permit.

By December 1909, Natalia was pregnant. Fearful that her husband would try to claim the child and take it away from her, her desire for a divorce grew stronger. Eventually, after prolonged negotiations and a hefty pay-off (200,000 rubles), Wulfert agreed to a divorce on the pretence that he had been unfaithful. Natalia's divorce petition was submitted to the Moscow Ecclesiastical Consistory Court on 19 February 1910, but by July 1910 it had not been granted. When she gave birth to a son on 24 July 1910, the child was legally Wulfert's. The boy was named George in honour of Michael's late brother. It was said that Wulfert was bought off with a bribe of 200,000 roubles, and the date of their divorce was back-dated, so that George was recognised as Natalia's illegitimate son, though inheriting her noble status, rather than the legitimate child of Wulfert's.

In May 1911, Nicholas II granted Natalia the surname "Brasova" and the right to live at Michael's estate at Brasovo, 70 miles (110 kilometres) from his posting at Orel. Michael, Natalia and her two children moved there immediately. By the end of the year, Michael was posted to a command in Saint Petersburg, and they moved to the capital. He officially lived in regimental quarters while paying for a 28-room apartment at 16 Liteyny Prospekt for her. She felt trapped in the apartment, feared that her letters were opened, and was ostracised by society. After a few months, Michael moved her to a villa at 24 Nikolaevskaya, Gatchina, nearer to his base at the Gatchina Palace.

== Third marriage ==
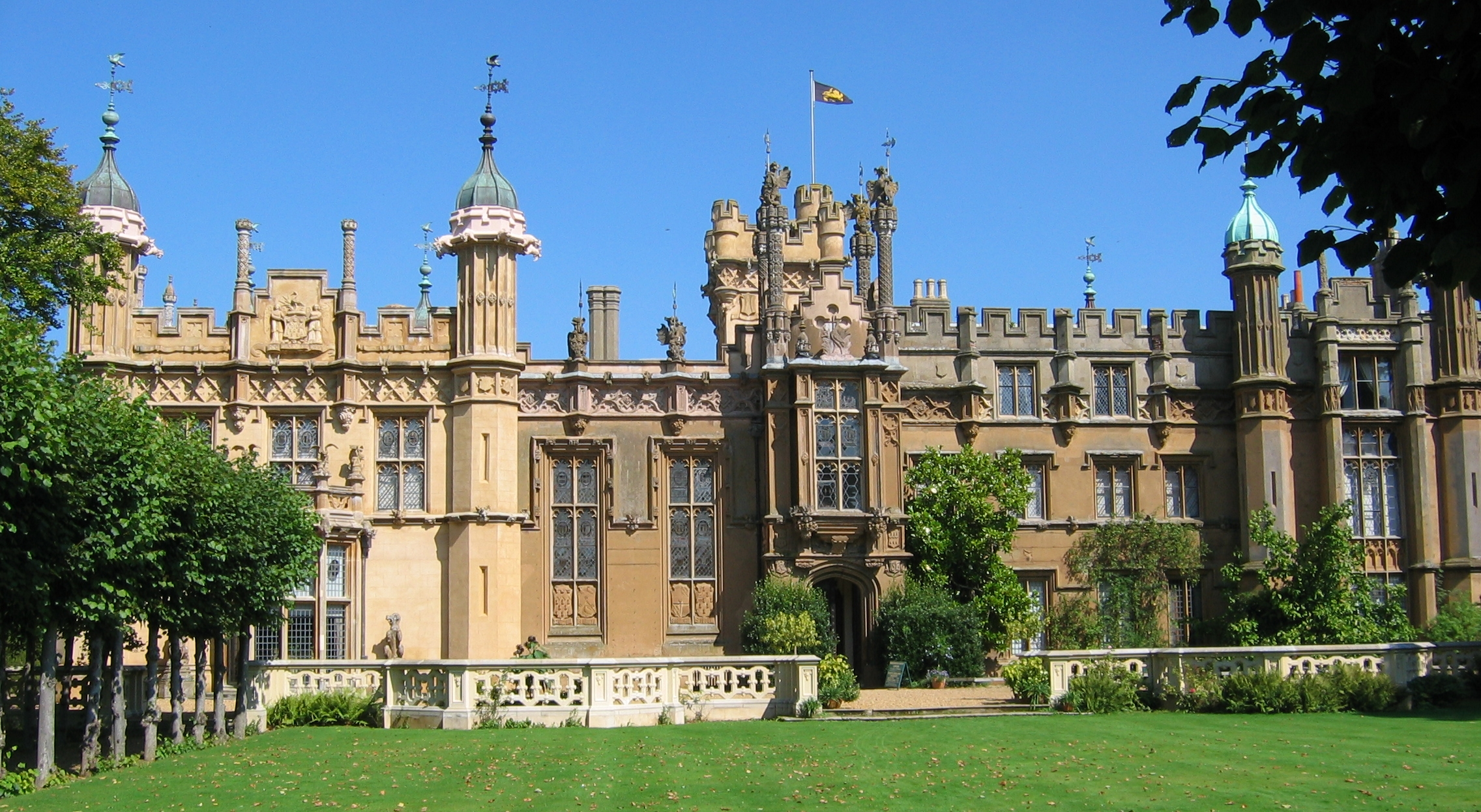
Knebworth House

Just as they had done for the previous two years, in summer 1912, Michael and Natalia holidayed in Western Europe. After shaking off agents of Nicholas II's secret police, the Okhrana, Michael and Natalia married in Vienna on 16 October 1912 in a Serbian Orthodox Church. They had successfully planned the wedding without either Nicholas II's or the Okhrana's knowledge. On their eventual arrival in Cannes, after a few days travelling through Venice and Milan, Natalia's two children joined them from Russia. The Grand Duke wrote to his brother, the Tsar, to inform him of the marriage, but because Natalia was divorced and not of royal blood the Tsar refused to approve it. Michael was perceived by the court as being "under the hypnotic influence of a malicious vamp". Nicholas II said Natalia was "such a cunning, wicked beast that it's disgusting even to talk about her". Michael was removed from the imperial succession, his property was put under sequestration and exiled from Russia in disgrace. Though members of society felt some sympathy for Michael, thinking his punishment severe, there was little sympathy for Natalia. Despite marrying a Grand Duke, she was not entitled to be known as "Grand Duchess", and instead used the style "Madame" or "Countess Brasova".

Until September 1913, they stayed in hotels throughout Europe, without any decrease in their standard of living. They met Michael's sister Grand Duchess Xenia and cousin Grand Duke Andrew, and in July 1913, they saw Michael's mother in London who told Natalia "a few home truths" according to Xenia's diary. From September 1913, they leased an English country house, Knebworth, 20 miles (32 km) north of London. Natalia acted as hostess for any of their guests, which included her friend Chaliapin, the Ballets Russes, and the artist Serge Sudeikin. As a divorcée, however, Natalia was often excluded from invitations to social events elsewhere; the divorced were not received at court and could not enter the Royal Enclosure at Ascot.

== War ==
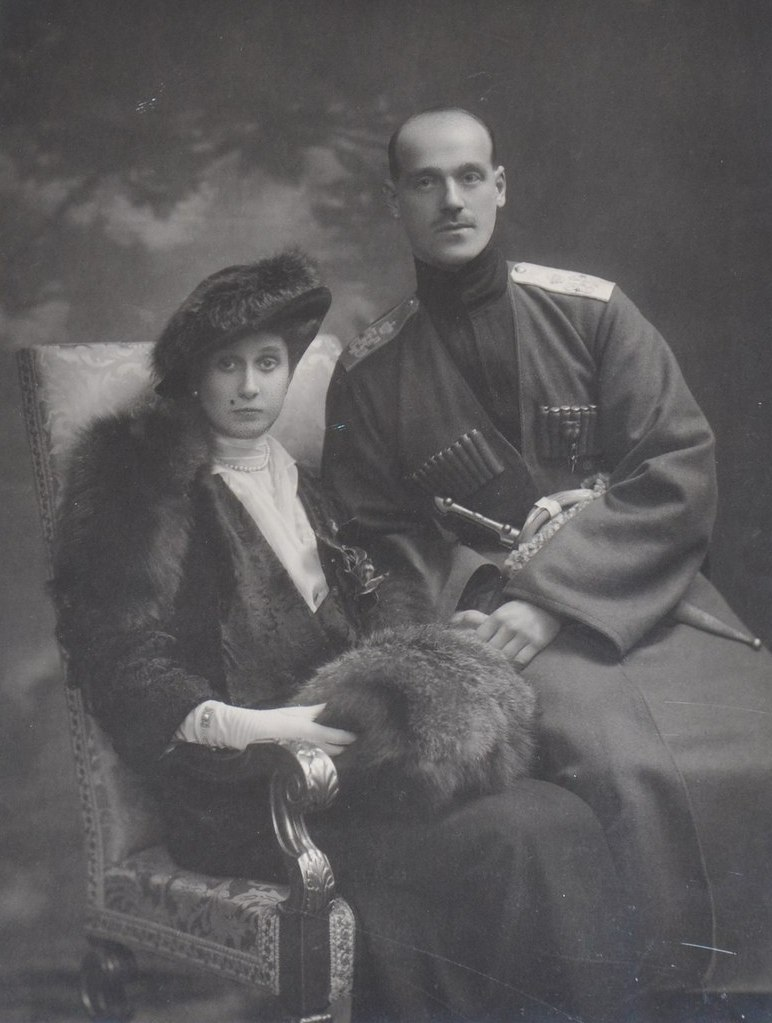
Natalia and Grand Duke Michael

Upon the outbreak of World War I, Michael requested Nicholas II's permission to return home and to the army, with the understanding his wife and children could accompany him. Nicholas agreed and the family returned to the house on Nikolaevskaya street; Natalia was still not permitted to live in any of the imperial palaces. Michael was appointed to the rank of major-general, and given command of the Savage Division (Дикая Дивизия) formed from Chechens, Ingushes and Daghestani. The post was perceived as a relatively low position in the Army, and was believed to be Nicholas II's punishment for Michael's marriage.

As was expected of women in the imperial family, Natalia founded two hospitals for wounded soldiers and officers, one at Gatchina and one at Saint Petersburg, in properties owned by Michael. In January 1915, her sister Olga died in Moscow, and she went there for the funeral. In February 1915, her eldest sister Vera also died.

At her hotel in Moscow, Michael's cousin Grand Duke Dmitri Pavlovich of Russia declared that he was in love with her. Natalia referred to Dmitri as "Lily-of-the-Valley". Dmitri had a reputation as a rake, though Natalia was flattered, she turned him down and told her husband of the encounter. Michael was jealous about Natalia's feelings for Dmitri: "What you are writing to me about Lily-of-the-Valley, i.e., how tenderly, tenderly you love him and also that he comes to see you because he likes you and totally succumbed to your charm and besides, you say that conquering such a heart means much to you—I believe that if you just stop to consider the meaning of these several sentences you have written, you will realise what pain you have given me by writing them." Natalia told Michael, "Believe me, my affection for him does not in the least interfere with my love for you."

In March 1915, Nicholas II agreed to legitimise George, and grant him the style of Count Brasov, although George still held no claim to the throne. While George was recognized as a count of the Empire, it appears that no such dignity was accorded Natalia. Natalia's social circle expanded as more people began to accept her. As the war began to go badly for the Russians, Natalia was dismayed by the change in Michael's appearance as he abandoned his smart uniforms and decorations and wore a plain uniform with his muddy boots. Michael was "deeply upset" by Natalia's criticisms of his decision to be in the frontline of the war. He wrote to her, "the present time is so hard for Russia that my conscience could not allow me not to join the frontline service – and I am convinced that having done that, I also brought you some good in terms of public opinion, which, unfortunately, we can't totally ignore."

Natalia's social circle widened to include deputies in the Duma, and she was perceived as a liberal who supported a constitutional monarchy rather than the Tsar's autocracy. The Tsarina, Alexandra, even feared that Natalia was conspiring to make Michael Emperor. The Tsarina and Dowager Empress still would not accept Natalia. A portrait of her in a Kiev hospital she had funded with her own money was hidden by hospital staff for a visit by the Dowager Empress, and Alexandra had an exhibition of photographs of Michael and Natalia cleared by the imperial police. Natalia was depressed by the snubs, and by her separation from Michael, who was still at the front. In September 1916, they reunited at Mogilev, and spent time at Brasovo and Gatchina for the next six weeks, until Michael fell ill with stomach ulcers. They moved to the Crimea for Michael's recuperation. Christmas 1916 was spent at Brasovo as a family, where Natalia's daughter was "thrilled to the core" to hear that Dimitri had helped murder Rasputin, Tsarina Alexandra's self-styled spiritual mentor.

== Revolution ==
After the February Revolution in 1917, Nicholas abdicated in Michael's favour, but Michael refused to accept the throne until ratified by the will of the people through the Constituent Assembly. By naming Michael as his successor, Nicholas effectively reversed the long-standing law that morganatically married dynasts forfeited rights of succession, but his actions were ultimately irrelevant. Power lay with the revolutionaries, not with the Tsar, whether it was Nicholas or Michael. Michael and his family were placed under house arrest in Gatchina.

In September 1917, the house arrest was lifted. At the end of the following month the Prime Minister, Alexander Kerensky, was deposed in the October Revolution and the Bolsheviks seized power. With a permit to travel issued by Peter Polotsov, a former army colleague of Michael's who held a command in Saint Petersburg, the family planned to move to the greater safety of Finland. Valuables were packed and the children were moved to an estate south of Gatchina owned by Vladimir Dmitrievich Nabokov, the brother of one of Natalia's closest friends (Nadine Vonlyarlarskaya) and the father of the famous writer, Vladimir Vladimirovich Nabokov. The Bolsheviks discovered their plan, however, and their escape was blocked. The children returned to Gatchina, and they were once again under house arrest. Natalia managed to gain access to her safety deposit box, by claiming that she needed to examine some papers at the bank, and thus retrieved as much of her jewellery as she could conceal without arousing suspicion. The house arrest was lifted in November, but on 7 March 1918 Michael and Nicholas Johnson—who had been his secretary since December 1912—were re-arrested on the orders of Moisei Uritsky, the Head of the Petrograd secret police. They were imprisoned at Bolshevik headquarters in the Smolny Institute.

Natalia visited Michael the next two days, 8 and 9 March 1918, with their friend Princess Putyatina. On 9 March, she barged her way into Lenin's office, which was in the same building, to remonstrate with him. In the evening, the Council of the People's Commissars decided to send Michael and Johnson into internal exile. On 11 March, they were sent a thousand miles eastwards to the remote city of Perm.

Concerned for her entire family's safety, Natalia made plans for the children to be taken abroad. With the help of the Danish embassy, which was next-door to Princess Puyatina's apartment, George was smuggled out of the country to Denmark by his governess, Miss Margaret Neame. The Danes extended diplomatic protection to the villa in Gatchina by pretending to rent it and flying the Danish flag over the house. Natalia wanted to join Michael in Perm, and after repeated pleading received a travel permit to join him. They spent about a week together, until an army of disgruntled Czechs advanced on Perm. The Bolsheviks had attempted to ship prisoners-of-war from Austria-Hungary out of Russia, ethnic Czech troops amongst them. The Czechs, however, were not going home to fight once more for the Austrian empire, but to fight for a separate independent homeland. The Germans demanded that the Bolsheviks disarm the Czechs, with the result that the Czech forces joined with the White Army, fighting against the Bolsheviks. With the approach of the Czechs, Michael and Natalia feared that she would become trapped in Perm, possibly in a dangerous situation, and so on 18 May she left for Moscow.

In Moscow, Natalia continued to badger Bolshevik Commissars, including Lenin, Trotsky and Sverdlov, for Michael's release, but to no avail. In June 1918, her husband and Johnson were shot by their captors on the outskirts of Perm. To cover their tracks, the Perm authorities distributed a concocted story that Michael was abducted by unidentified men and had disappeared. Natalia went to Uritsky in a quest for an explanation, but Uritsky ordered her arrest and incarceration. The Soviet disinformation about Michael's disappearance led to unfounded rumours that he had escaped and was leading a successful counter-revolution. Natalia heard the rumours in prison, and chose to believe them. Ten weeks after her imprisonment, in early September, Natalia pretended that she had developed tuberculosis, and was moved to a nursing home. Once there, she escaped and took refuge in the apartment above her brother-in-law's with family friend Princess Vyazemskaya. Uritsky had been murdered in late August, and the Bolsheviks were terrorising Petrograd in what was later called the Red Terror. Natalia's daughter, "Tata", was arrested and imprisoned, but released after a few days when it became apparent she had no knowledge of her mother's whereabouts. With no money or food, "Tata" made her way to her uncle's apartment, and so was fortuitously re-united with her mother.

== Exile ==
The Germans believed the widespread rumours that Michael was still alive, and plotted to rescue Natalia from Russia in an attempt to gain influence with Michael. Through the German-controlled Ukrainian consulate, Natalia and her daughter were provided with false passports. Natalia's daughter used her own name, while Natalia's passport was in the name of a Red Cross nurse called Frau Tania Klenow. They travelled separately to Kiev, with Natalia disguised as a Red Cross Nurse. They were still in Kiev when the war ended with Germany's defeat on 11 November 1918. German authority began to collapse. Natalia and her daughter, along with Princess Vyazemskaya and Natalia's widowed brother-in-law Aleksei Matveev, who had both made it to Kiev as well, fled to Odessa in the hope they could escape by sea. Two British naval vessels at the port, HMS Nereide and HMS Skirmisher, provided them with sanctuary. Aboard HMS Nereide they were evacuated to Constantinople.

By way of HMS Agamemnon to Malta, merchant ship to Marseille, and rail to Paris, Natalia arrived in England. Johnson's widowed mother had leased a house, Snape in Wadhurst, Sussex, for Michael's family, and all the furniture and furnishings stored at Paddockhurst were moved in. George arrived from Copenhagen with his governess, Margaret Neame, in spring 1919, and was sent to an English boarding school. Natalia's daughter, Natalia Mamontova, was enrolled at a convent school in France. For funds, Natalia used money in Michael's bank accounts in Paris and Copenhagen, and started selling her jewellery. She met Michael's mother, the Dowager Empress Marie, who had also escaped Russia, in London, and their meeting this time was courteous. Conflicting rumours about Michael's fate and whereabouts continued without any solid news. In 1920, "Tata" was sent to Cheltenham Ladies' College and George was enrolled at Harrow School. Natalia moved out of Snape as the lease ended, and moved to Percy Lodge near Richmond, Surrey.

On 12 August 1921, 18-year-old Natalia Mamontova married future BBC broadcaster Val Gielgud, against her mother's wishes and without her foreknowledge. Natalia Mamontova was on school break and returned home as if nothing had happened. When Natalia found out, she ordered her daughter out of her house. Natalia left Percy Lodge and moved into an apartment in Kensington. The Gielguds divorced in 1923, and Natalia Mamontova married composer and music critic Cecil Gray.

By 1924, there was still no sign of Michael, and Natalia had him declared legally dead on 5 July 1924. She inherited his estate in Britain, which was valued at a mere £95. The following month, Michael's cousin, Grand Duke Cyril Vladimirovich, declared himself Emperor on the basis that he had inherited the throne at the moment of the previous Emperor's death, despite the abolition of the Russian monarchy by the communists. In 1928, he gave Natalia the title of Princess, followed in 1935 by the style "Her Serene Highness Princess Romanovskaya-Brasova". He made George a Prince. Cyril's claim to the throne was met with opposition from within the Romanov family because at his birth his mother was a Lutheran and not a member of the Russian Orthodox Church. Furthermore, Cyril had married Princess Victoria Melita of Saxe-Coburg and Gotha, who was a divorcée and his first cousin, without the Emperor's consent. The House law that determined the Russian line of succession excluded princes born to non-Orthodox mothers, and princes who married without the Tsar's consent. The Russian Orthodox Church did not recognise Victoria's divorce from her first husband as valid, and did not permit marriage between first cousins. Cyril's title, and by extension Natalia's and George's, were only recognised by Cyril's supporters.

== Decline ==
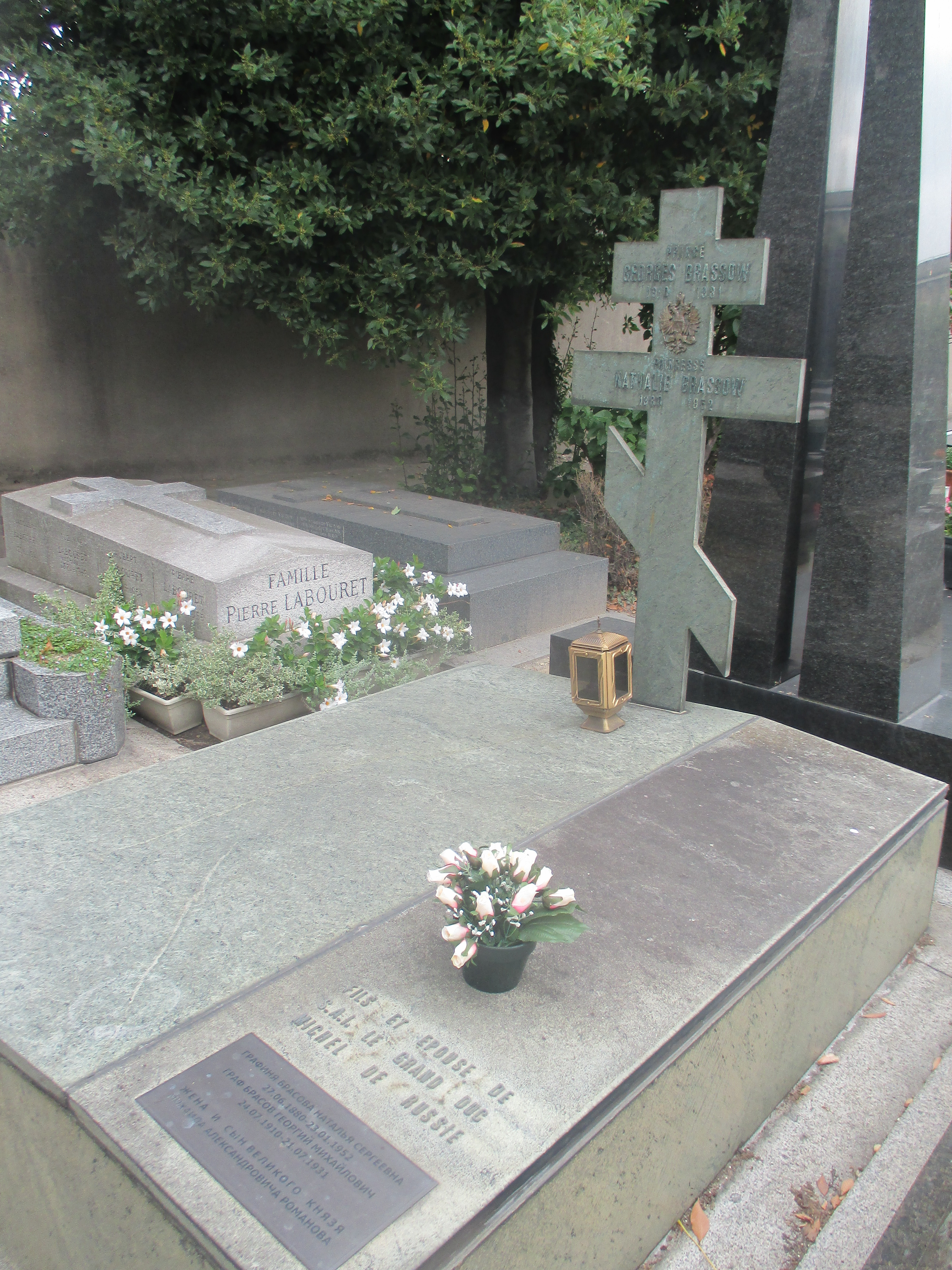
Her grave in cimetière de Passy in Paris.

To save money, in 1927 Natalia moved to Paris where living costs were lower than in London. George joined her in France, but he was killed after a car accident in 1931. She was at his bedside when he died, though he had not regained consciousness after the crash. She was emotionally devastated. Natalia's granddaughter, Pauline Gray, was born in 1929, but the Grays' marriage also ended in divorce. Natalia Mamontova's third and last marriage was to naval officer Michael Majolier, with whom she had a second daughter, Alexandra, born in 1934.

Natalia continued attempts to recover Michael's assets. The Polish government had seized Michael's Polish estate, and Natalia sued them for its return or compensation. By the Peace of Riga, the Poles were entitled to any imperial property in the former Russian Poland, but Natalia pointed out that Michael was already dead before the Peace, and so any of Michael's property in Poland was legally hers, as a commoner. In 1937, the court ruled against her. In 1938, she did receive a pay-out from the German courts, when the Tsar's estate in Germany was shared between all his heirs, but hyper-inflation had reduced its value. She continued to sell anything she could in a desperate attempt to raise cash.

During World War II, Natalia and her daughter were separated as Natalia lived in Paris, and her daughter was in Britain. They were unable to communicate with each other until after the war, by which time Natalia was penniless and lived as a refugee in an attic box-room. On 23 January 1952, she died of cancer at the Laënnec charity hospital in Paris in complete poverty, and was buried in Passy Cemetery (Section 9, near the intersection with the outer wall and Section 8) in Paris beside her son George, Count Brasov.
