= George Mikhailovich, Count Brasov =

Russian noble

George Mikhailovich
- Count Brasov
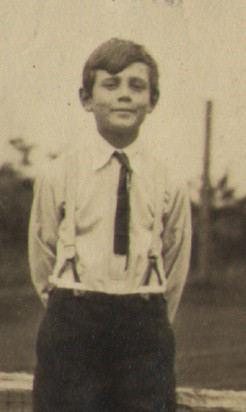
- Born: 6 August 1910; Moscow, Russian Empire
- Died: 21 July 1931 (aged 20); Sens, France
- Burial: Passy Cemetery, Paris, France
- Father: Grand Duke Michael Alexandrovich of Russia
- Mother: Natalia Brasova

George Mikhailovich, Count Brasov (Russian: Георгий Михайлович, граф Брасов; 6 August [O.S. 24 July] 1910 – 21 July 1931) was a Russian noble and a descendant of the House of Romanov through a morganatic line.

== Early life ==
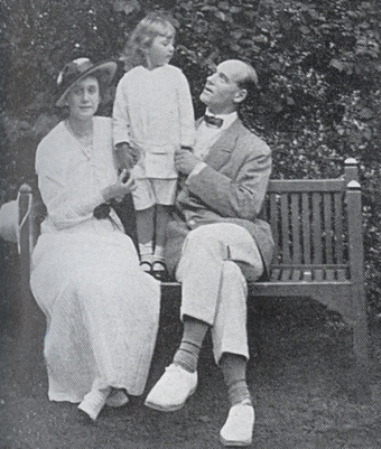
George with his parents

George was born in his mother's Moscow apartment on Petersburg Road, near Petrovsky Park. His parents were Grand Duke Michael Alexandrovich of Russia and his mistress, Natalia Sergeyevna Wulfert. Grand Duke Michael was the youngest son of Emperor Alexander III of Russia and Empress Marie (formerly Princess Dagmar of Denmark), and a brother of Emperor Nicholas II.

At the time of George's birth, Natalia was still legally married to her second husband, army officer Vladimir Vladimirovich Wulfert. Wulfert and Grand Duke Michael had served in the same regiment, The Dowager Empress's Life Guard Cuirassier Regiment, known as the Blue Cuirassiers, stationed at Gatchina near Saint Petersburg. After the scandal that arose from Michael's affair with Wulfert's wife, Wulfert was transferred to Moscow, and Michael was transferred to the Chernigov Hussars at Orel. Michael and Natalia feared that her husband would try to claim custodial rights over George, and had instituted divorce proceedings, but the divorce was only finalised after George's birth. It was said that Wulfert was bought off with a bribe of 200,000 roubles, and the date of the Wulferts divorce was back-dated, so that George was recognised as Natalia's illegitimate son, though inheriting her noble status, rather than the legitimate child of Wulfert's.

George was baptised on 22 September 1910 at the Church of St Basil of Caesarea in Moscow, by Father Peter Pospelov, and named after his late uncle, Grand Duke George Alexandrovich of Russia, who had died in 1899. His godparents were Aleksei Matveev and Margaret Abakanovich. Matveev was the husband of George's maternal aunt, Olga, and Abakanovich was a family friend who was married to Michael's adjutant. Abakanovich was absent, and George's half-sister, Natalia Sergeyevna Mamontova, Natalia's daughter from her first marriage, stood proxy. On 13 November 1910, Emperor Nicholas II decreed that the boy would be known as George Mikhailovich Brasov, with the surname taken from one of Michael's estates: Brasovo near Orel.

Grand Duke Michael was second in the line of imperial succession after his nephew, Tsarevich Alexei, but Alexei suffered from hemophilia and it was feared that he would not live long enough to inherit the throne. Under Russian House Law, Michael, as a member of the imperial family, could not marry without the consent of the ruling monarch, Nicholas II. Nicholas would not grant permission for Michael to marry Natalia, however, because Natalia was twice divorced and not of royal blood. In 1912, Alexei suffered a life-threatening hemorrhage in the thigh and groin while the family was at Spala, Poland. Michael feared that Alexei would not survive, which would make him heir and the possibility of his marriage to Natalia even more remote. Consequently, Michael decided to marry Natalia anyway. They married in a Serbian Orthodox Church in Vienna on 16 October 1912. A few days later, George, his newly-wed parents, and Natalia's daughter from her first marriage met up in Cannes. From there, Michael wrote to his mother and brother to inform them of the marriage. The imperial family was shocked, seeing it as a betrayal of duty, especially as it was done while the Tsarevich was so close to dying. Michael and his family were exiled from Russia. They stayed in grand hotels in Cannes, Paris, Chexbres, Bad Kissingen and London before settling in England in September 1913.

== Childhood ==
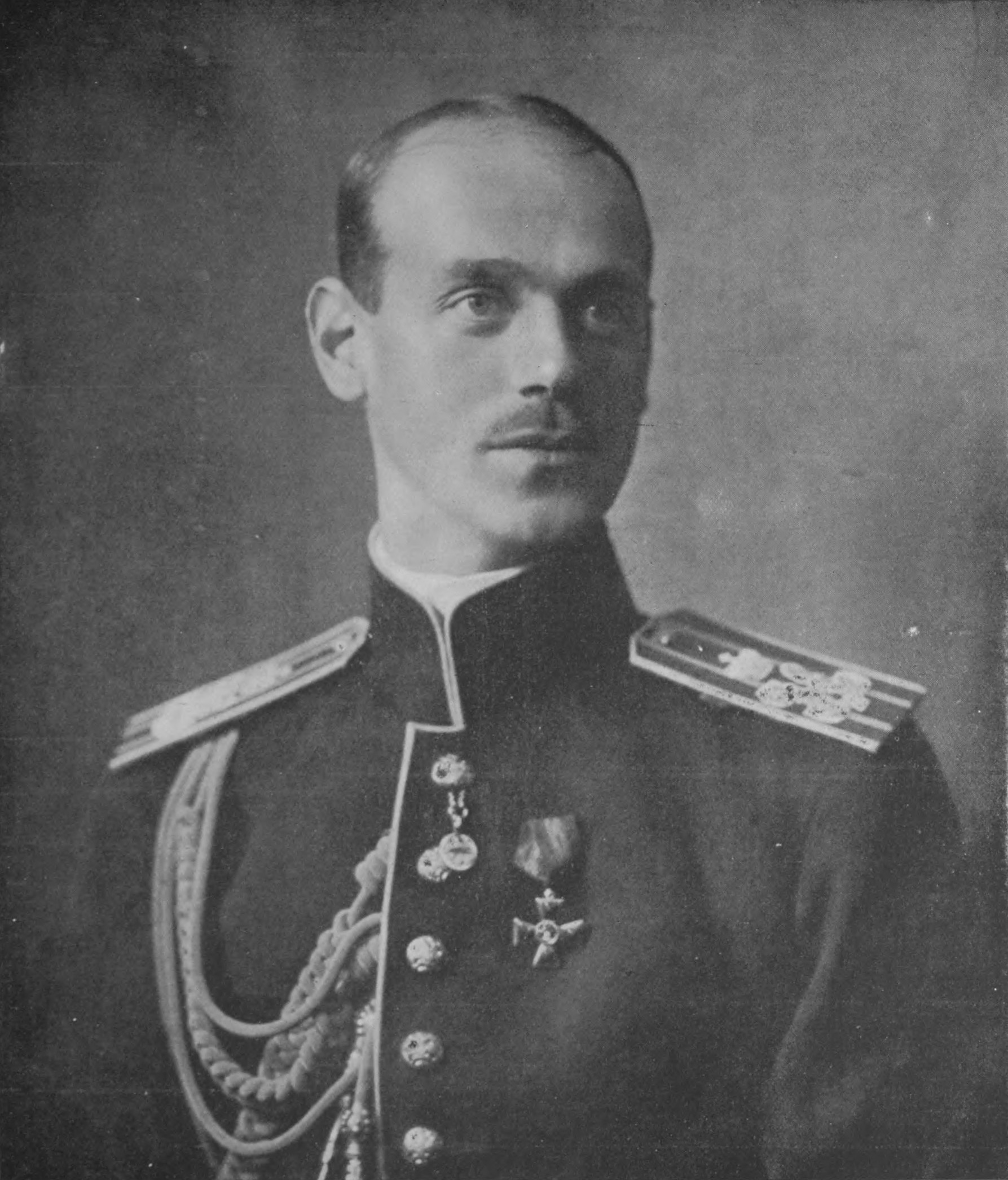
George's father, Grand Duke Michael

In the fall of 1914, at the start of World War I, Grand Duke Michael requested permission to return to Russia to rejoin the army, which was fighting on the Eastern Front. Nicholas II granted his request and George and his family returned to live in a villa at 24 Nikolaevskaya, Gatchina, that Michael had bought for Natalia. (Natalia was not permitted to live at any of the imperial palaces.) George's English governess, Miss Rata, accompanied them to Russia, after marrying Michael's head groom, Mr. Bennett. Michael became a general and earned a Cross of St. George, the highest military award, for action in the Carpathian Mountains.

Michael wrote to Nicholas asking him to legitimise George so, he argued, that the boy would be provided for in the event of Michael's death at the front. Six months later, Nicholas legitimised George by decree, and created him a count. George and his descendants would, however, be excluded from the order of succession.

By 1915, Mrs Bennett was pregnant, so she left the family's service and was replaced by her friend and fellow Englishwoman, Margaret Neame. George's father remained at the front until September 1916, but he was invalided from October with stomach ulcers, and the family spent the winter in the Crimea as Michael recuperated, and then spent Christmas at Brasovo. The Christmas holiday was cut short, however, when a guest's child contracted diphtheria and died. At risk of infection, the family evacuated the estate by snow-bound sleigh ride. It was the last time any of them would see Brasovo.

== February Revolution ==
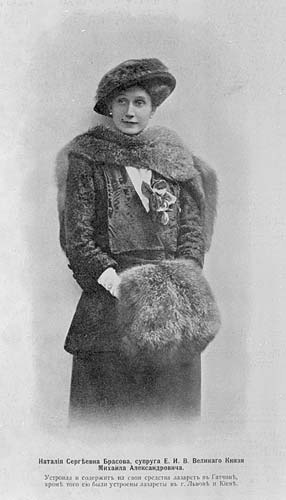
George's mother, Natalia Brasova, in a World War I postcard

New Year 1917 was spent back at Gatchina. During the February Revolution two months later, Nicholas II abdicated for himself and his son and nominated Michael to succeed him. Michael declined to accept unless ratified by an elected assembly, and issued a manifesto that recognised the de facto control of the Russian Provisional Government. With the revolutionaries in power, and the influence of the imperial family all but ended, George and his family were placed under house arrest at the villa in Gatchina.

In September 1917, the house arrest was lifted. At the end of the following month, Prime Minister Alexander Kerensky was deposed in the October Revolution and the Bolsheviks seized power. With a permit to travel issued by Peter Polotsov, a former army colleague of Michael's who held a command in Saint Petersburg, the family planned to move to the greater safety of Finland. Valuables were packed and the children were moved to an estate south of Gatchina owned by Vladimir Dmitrievich Nabokov, the brother of one of Natalia's closest friends (Nadine Vonlyarlarskaya) and the father of the famous writer Vladimir Vladimirovich Nabokov. George was friends with Nabokov senior's niece, Sophie Vonlyarlarskaya. Their plan was discovered by the Bolsheviks, and the children returned to Gatchina, once again under house arrest.

In March 1918, George's father was exiled to the remote city of Perm by the Bolsheviks, and Natalia became concerned for her family's safety. She turned to her friends, Prince and Princess Putyatin, for help. The Putyatins' apartment in Saint Petersburg was next door to the Danish embassy, and the Danes agreed to surreptitiously smuggle George out of the country. The Danish diplomat overseeing prisoner-of-war exchange, Captain Frits Cramer, gave George and his governess, Miss Neame, rooms at the Burturlina Mansion. This was the former Austro-Hungarian Embassy and was being used by the Danish Red Cross to house POWs awaiting repatriation. After five weeks Margaret and George, posing as mother and son on false Austro-Hungarian passports, slipped out of Bolshevik Russia on a train carrying prisoners-of-war who were being repatriated. A Danish gentleman, Mr Sorensen of the Danish Red Cross, accompanied them, since neither spoke German, and if they were discovered Miss Neame was in danger of being shot as a spy. They reached the Danish embassy in Berlin safely, and were given shelter by the ambassador, Count Carl Moltke. Informed of their escape, Wilhelm II, German Emperor, chose to ignore the fact that the British Miss Neame was an enemy alien, and permitted them to continue their journey to Copenhagen.

== Exile ==
In the early hours of 13 June 1918, George's father was shot dead on the outskirts of Perm by the Cheka, the Bolshevik secret police. The circumstances of his father's death would not become known until after George's death. Still believing Michael to be alive, George's mother and half-sister Natalia, his mother's daughter from her first marriage, were smuggled out of Russia to Kiev, in German-controlled Ukraine, by the Germans. After the armistice in November 1918, the Royal Navy evacuated George's mother and half-sister to England, and George and Miss Neame joined them in a rented house at Wadhurst, Sussex, just after Easter 1919.

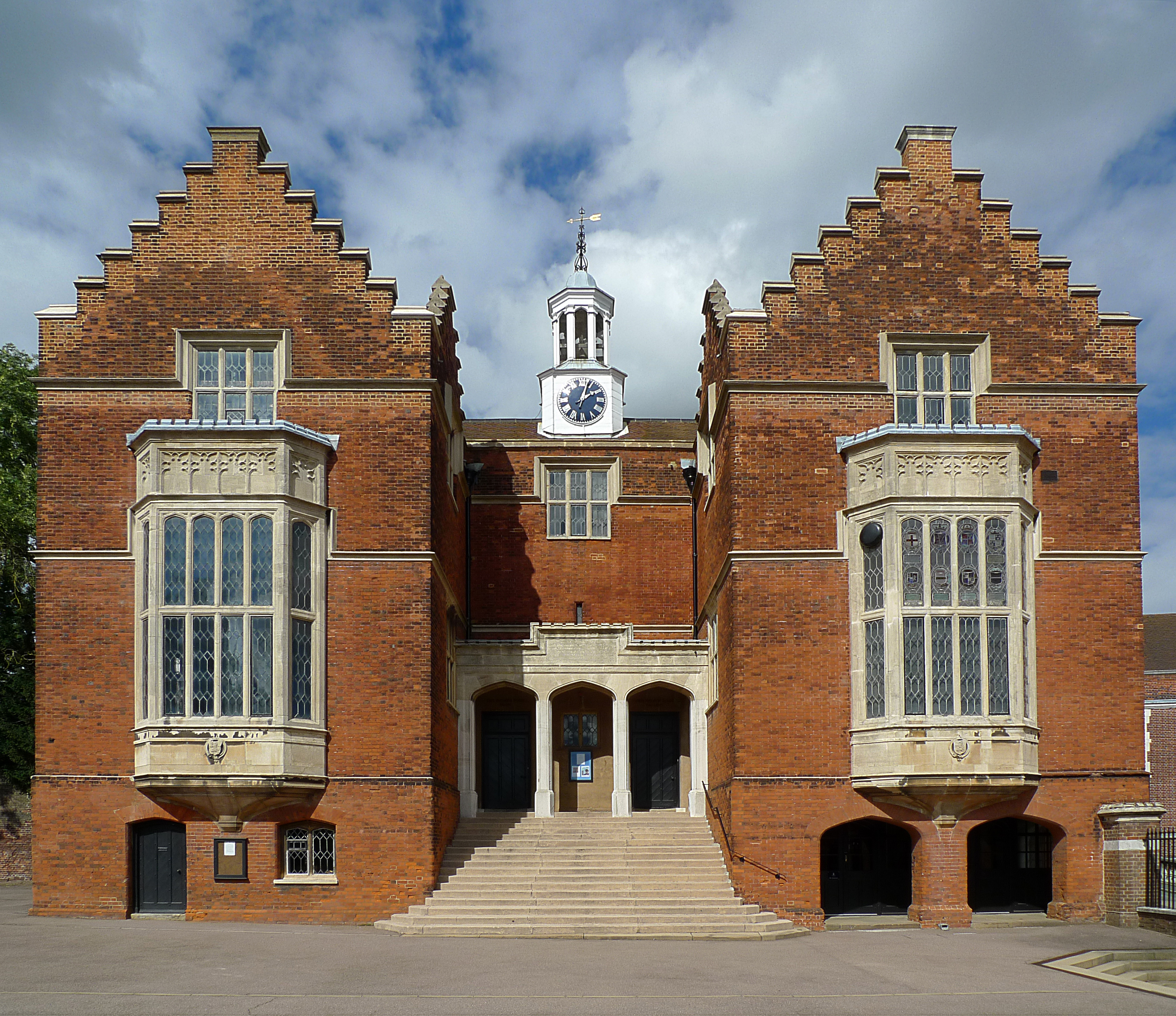
Old Schools, Harrow

George was enrolled at St Leonards-on-Sea College in September 1919, until he moved to Harrow, a prominent public boarding school in 1920. In 1927, due to financial problems, his mother relocated to Paris but he remained in England to finish his school year. He then went to another boarding school, École des Roches in Verneuil, Normandy, and then the Sorbonne. As he matured, many remarked at his strong resemblance to his father.

To George's amusement, the idea of him claiming the throne was circulated during his lifetime. By the 1920s, the Soviets had a firm grip on power in Russia, and the return of the monarchy was not a serious possibility. Nevertheless, George's cousin, Grand Duke Cyril Vladimirovich, declared himself Emperor Cyril and George a prince.

In 1928, George's grandmother, the Dowager Empress Marie, died and George inherited a third of her estate. He had enjoyed riding his Norton motorcycle as a teenager, and some of his inheritance was spent on a Chrysler sports car. In summer 1931, he finished his final examinations at the Sorbonne, and planned a holiday in the south of France with his 19-year-old Dutch friend, Edgar Moneanaar. On the drive from Paris to Cannes, their car skidded near Sens, while Moneanaar was driving. They crashed into a tree, and Moneanaar was killed. With both thighs broken and severe internal injuries, George was taken to hospital. Natalia rushed to be at his bedside. He died without recovering consciousness the following morning.

George was buried in Passy Cemetery in Paris. In 1952, his mother died from cancer, and she was interred beside him in a grave marked by a Slavonic cross of stone on a marble tomb. (Section 9, near the intersection with the outer wall and Section 8.) The gold inscription reads, Fils et Epouse de S.A.I. Grand Duc Michel de Russie.

Although he had no succession rights due to the morganatic marriage of his parents, George was the last male-line descendant of Alexander III of Russia.

== See also ==
- Descendants of Christian IX of Denmark - Lists members of European royalty sharing a mutual ancestor with George Mikhailovich, Count Brasov

== Notes ==
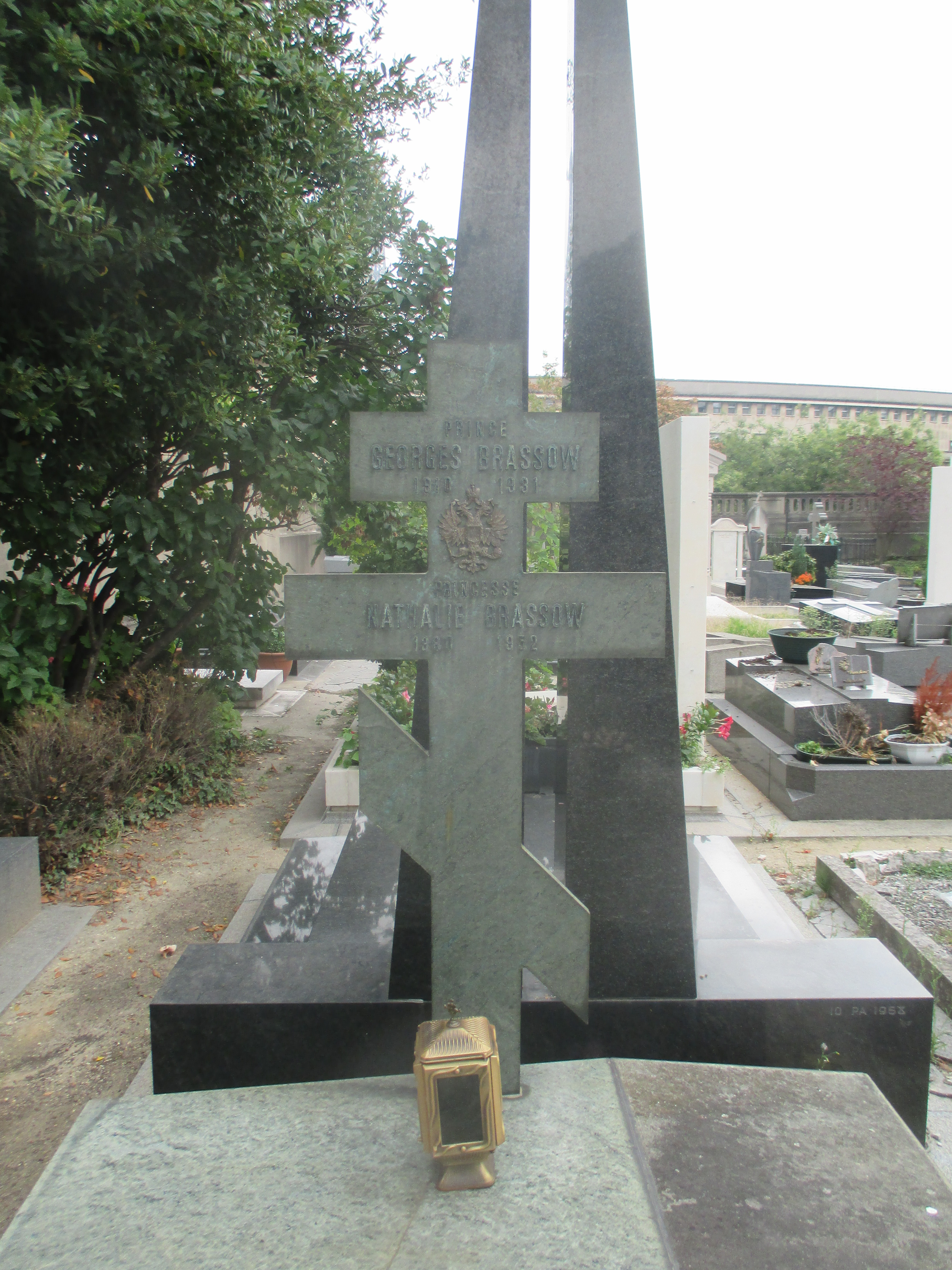
His grave in Paris.
