= Princess Thyra of Denmark (1880–1945) =

Danish princess

Princess Thyra
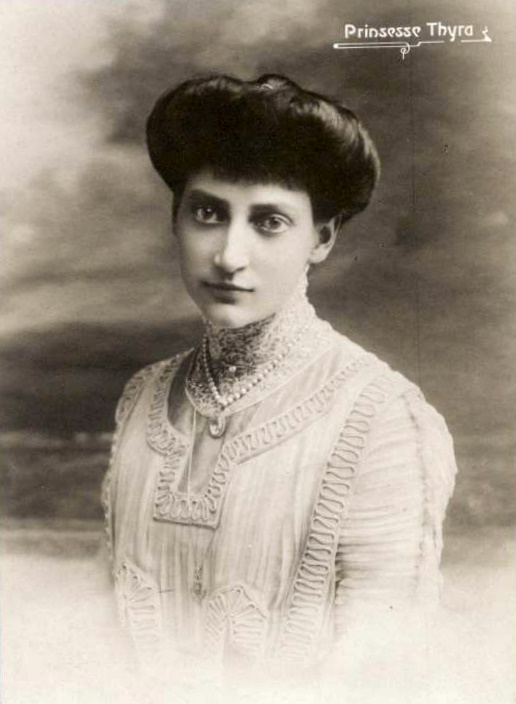
- Thyra, circa 1900
- Born: 14 March 1880; Copenhagen, Denmark
- Died: 2 November 1945 (aged 65); Copenhagen, Denmark
Names
- Thyra Louise Caroline Amalie Augusta Elisabeth
- House: Glücksburg
- Father: Frederik VIII of Denmark
- Mother: Louise of Sweden

Princess Thyra of Denmark (Thyra Louise Caroline Amalie Augusta Elisabeth; 14 March 1880 – 2 November 1945) was a member of the Danish royal family. She was the sixth child and third daughter of King Frederik VIII and Queen Louise of Denmark, and was also the younger sister of King Christian X of Denmark and King Haakon VII of Norway. Princess Thyra remained unmarried and had no children.

== Early life ==
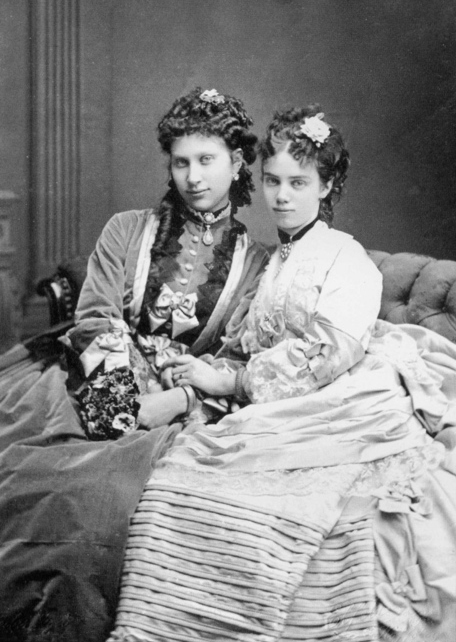
The mother and aunt of Thyra; Louise of Sweden as Princess of Denmark with her sister-in-law, Princess Thyra of Denmark, after whom Thyra was named.

Princess Thyra was born on 14 March 1880 in Frederik VIII's Palace, an 18th-century palace which forms part of the Amalienborg Palace complex in central Copenhagen, during the reign of her paternal grandfather, King Christian IX. She was the sixth child and third daughter of Crown Prince Frederick of Denmark and his wife Louise of Sweden. Her father was the eldest son of King Christian IX of Denmark and Louise of Hesse-Kassel, and her mother was the only daughter of King Charles XV of Sweden and Norway and Louise of the Netherlands. She was baptised with the names Thyra Louise Caroline Amalia Augusta Elisabeth, and was known as Princess Thyra (named after her paternal aunt Princess Thyra of Denmark).

Princess Thyra was raised with her siblings in the royal household in Denmark and grew up between her parents' residence in Copenhagen, the Frederik VIII's Palace at the Amalienborg Palace complex, and their country retreat, the Charlottenlund Palace, located by the coastline of the Øresund strait north of the city.

== Later life ==
In 1901, at the age of 21, Princess Thyra began a romantic relationship with a young court physician, Niels C. Ilsøe. When it was discovered that Thyra had grown romantically attached to a royal servant, he was promptly dismissed and moved to West Jutland where he worked as a general practitioner. He never married and, according to his family, he kept a picture of Princess Thyra on his nightstand for the rest of his life. Princess Thyra also remained unmarried, so it seems that the relationship was more than an early flirtation. At the time, the marriage of a princess to a person of unequal social rank was not a possibility. In 1922, however, Thyra’s younger sister, Princess Dagmar was allowed to marry a member of the lesser nobility, as social norms had changed over the years.

Princess Thyra died on 2 November 1945 in her apartment in Amaliegade in Copenhagen. She was 65 years old.

== Ancestry ==
Ancestors of Princess Thyra of Denmark

8. Frederick William, Duke of Schleswig-Holstein-Sonderburg-Glücksburg
4. Christian IX of Denmark
9. Princess Louise Caroline of Hesse-Kassel
2. Frederik VIII of Denmark
10. Prince William of Hesse-Kassel
5. Princess Louise of Hesse-Kassel
11. Princess Charlotte of Denmark
1. Princess Thyra of Denmark
12. Oscar I of Sweden and Norway
6. Charles XV of Sweden and Norway
13. Princess Josephine of Leuchtenberg
3. Princess Louise of Sweden and Norway
14. Prince Frederick of the Netherlands
7. Princess Louise of the Netherlands
15. Princess Louise of Prussia
