= Grand Duke George Alexandrovich of Russia =

Third son of Alexander III (1871–1899)

Grand Duke George Alexandrovich
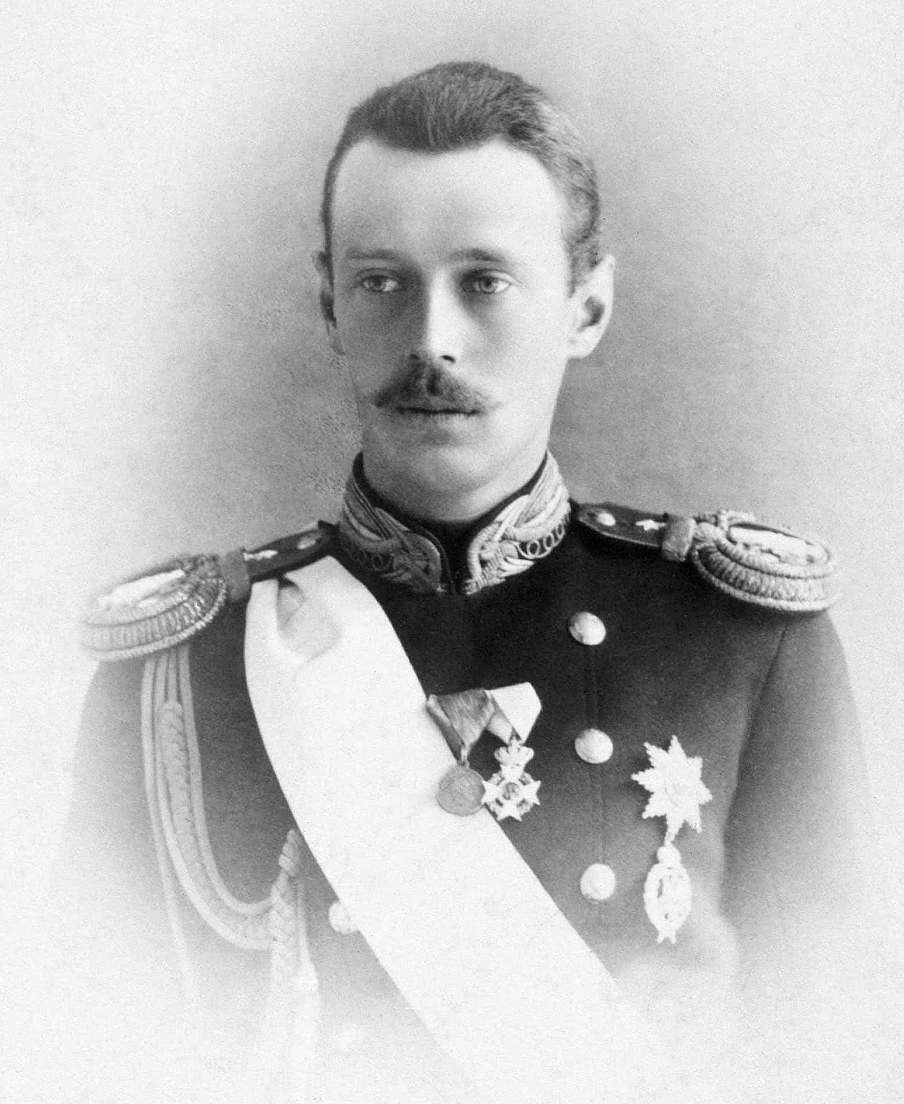
- Grand Duke George in 1892
- Born: 9 May 1871; Alexander Palace, Tsarskoye Selo, St. Petersburg, Russian Empire
- Died: 10 July 1899 (aged 28); Abastumani, Russian Empire
- Burial: Peter and Paul Cathedral, St. Petersburg, Russian Empire
Names
- George Alexandrovich Romanov
- House: Holstein-Gottorp-Romanov
- Father: Alexander III of Russia
- Mother: Dagmar of Denmark

Grand Duke George Alexandrovich of Russia (Russian: Георгий Александрович; 9 May [O.S. 27 April] 1871 – 10 July [O.S. 28 June] 1899) was the third son of Emperor Alexander III and Empress Maria of Russia and brother of Emperor Nicholas II.

== Childhood ==
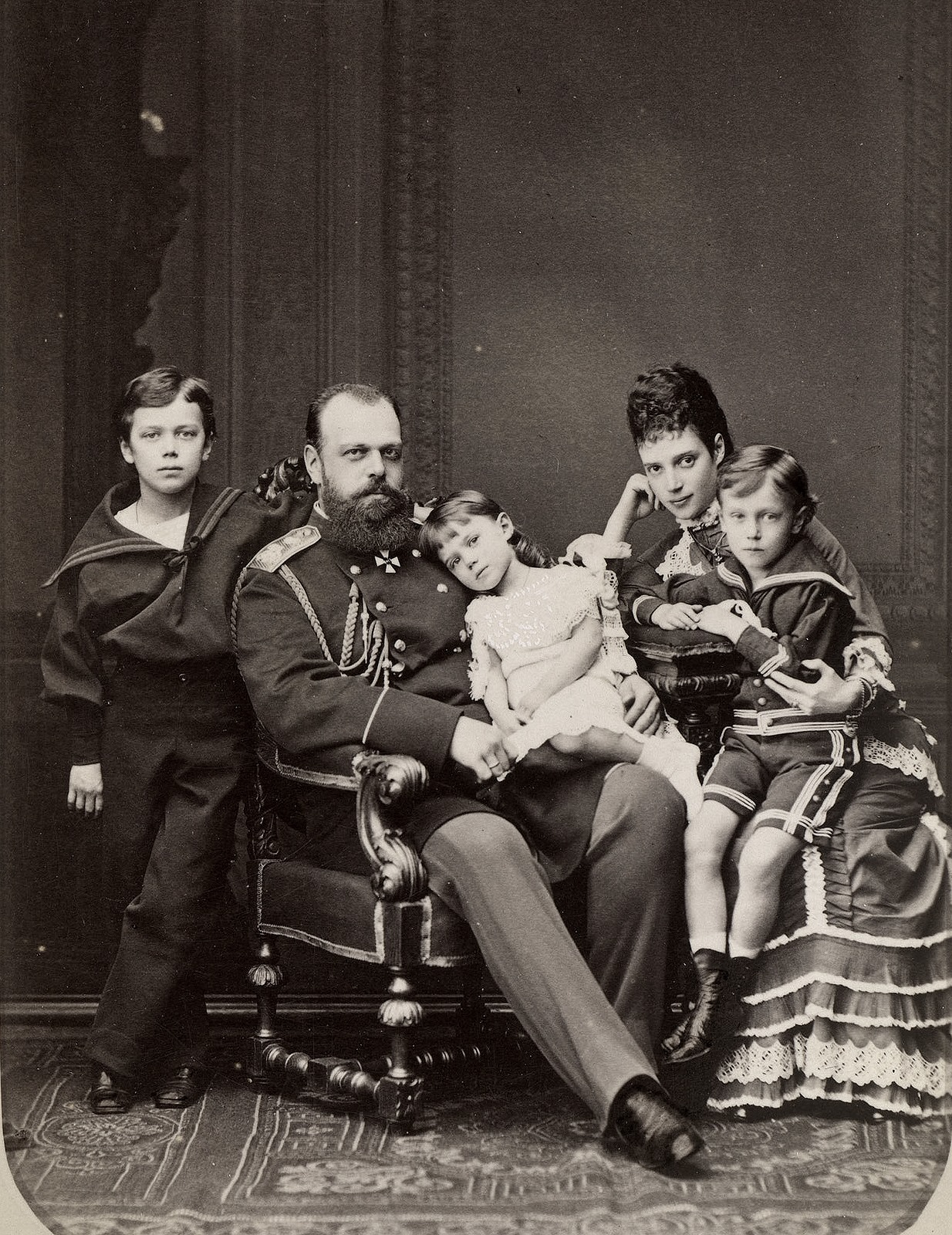
Grand Duke George as a child with his parents, brother Nicholas and sister Xenia.

George was named after his uncle, King George I of Greece. He was brought up in a spartan fashion with his siblings in the English manner. They slept on camp beds, rose at six and usually took cold baths (being occasionally allowed a warm bath in their mother's bathroom). Breakfast usually consisted of porridge and black bread, mutton cutlets or roast beef with peas. Baked potatoes were served for lunch and bread, butter and jam at teatime. George and Nicholas, his brother and later emperor, had a sitting-room, dining room, playroom and bedroom, all simply furnished. The only trace of ostentation was an icon surrounded by pearls and precious stones. Because of his parents' happy marriage he was brought up in an atmosphere of love and security that was missing in many royal households at the time.

On 27 May 1883, George's parents were crowned in a ceremony in the Uspensky Cathedral at the Kremlin in Moscow. The Emperor and Empress received the homage of the Imperial Family, including their sons, Nicholas and George. The family lived mostly in the security of the palace at Gatchina.

== Education, career and health ==
George was considered to be the most clever of the Imperial children and outgoing like his mother. George and Nicholas shared the same tutors but studied in adjoining rooms. They followed the course of the Academy of the Russian General Staff, their tutors being distinguished professors. Their English teacher, Charles Heath, had once been tutor to their uncles, Grand Dukes Sergei and Pavel. Both brothers spoke and wrote perfect English. From Mr. Heath they acquired a love of sport, particularly shooting and fly-fishing. They also spoke fluent French and passable German and Danish. George displayed signs of a promising career in the Navy before falling ill with tuberculosis in 1890.

The Emperor and Empress decided to send both Nicholas and George on a nine-month-long trip to Japan in 1890. George would go as a naval cadet and Nicholas to complete his education by seeing the world. They left Gatchina on 4 November 1890. Nicholas and George first went by warship to Athens where they were joined by their cousin, Prince George of Greece. From there, they traveled to Egypt, then to India. From Bombay in India, Nicholas telegraphed that his brother George had to remain on the ship because he had trouble with his leg. George's family was informed that he had a fever and would have to return home. George was diagnosed with acute bronchitis and was sent back to Athens where he could be examined by Imperial doctors. The Empress was distressed for both her sons: George, whose sickness affected her deeply, and Nicholas, who was now deprived of his brother's company. Nicholas also later returned home early following a failed assassination attempt on his life by Tsuda Sanzō, known as the Ōtsu incident.

== Tsesarevich ==
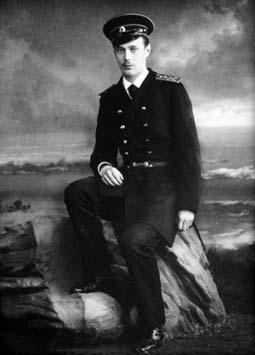
Grand Duke George Alexandrovitch.

In November 1894 Alexander III died and Nicholas became Emperor. At the time, Nicholas had no children, thus, according to the laws of succession of the Russian Empire, the Grand Duke George became Tsesarevich, the heir presumptive to the throne. George's ill-health had forced him to relocate to Likani, making it impossible for him to return to St. Petersburg for the funeral of his father. Nicholas wrote to his brother, "Constantly pray to God to send you a full and speedy recovery, and to comfort you because it is so much more difficult to be alone after such great sorrow than it is for us who are at least together!" George also missed the christenings of Nicholas' elder daughters, Olga and Tatiana. Shortly after the birth of Nicholas' third daughter, Maria, in June 1899, George wrote to his brother, "I am terribly sad that I have not yet been able to see your daughters and get to know them; but what can I do? It means it's not my fate, and everything is the will of God."

George was visited by his mother in Likani. In 1895, George and his mother visited Denmark and nearby Danish relatives.

Suddenly, his health started to deteriorate. "Yesterday, in the garden, he expectorated some blood...that frightened me more than I can tell – the surprise of it was shocking because he had been so well of late...I am quite desperate that this should have happened here." As a result, George was forbidden to smoke and was confined to his bed until he was fit enough to return to Likani. Writing to Nicholas back home once again, George said about his trip to Denmark, "Of course, it was good to see the family after 4 years, but it did not really do me any good, as I lost more than 5 pounds which I had put on with such difficulty in May and June. I also get out of breath more easily. So these are the results of my trip. Very annoying."

== Death ==
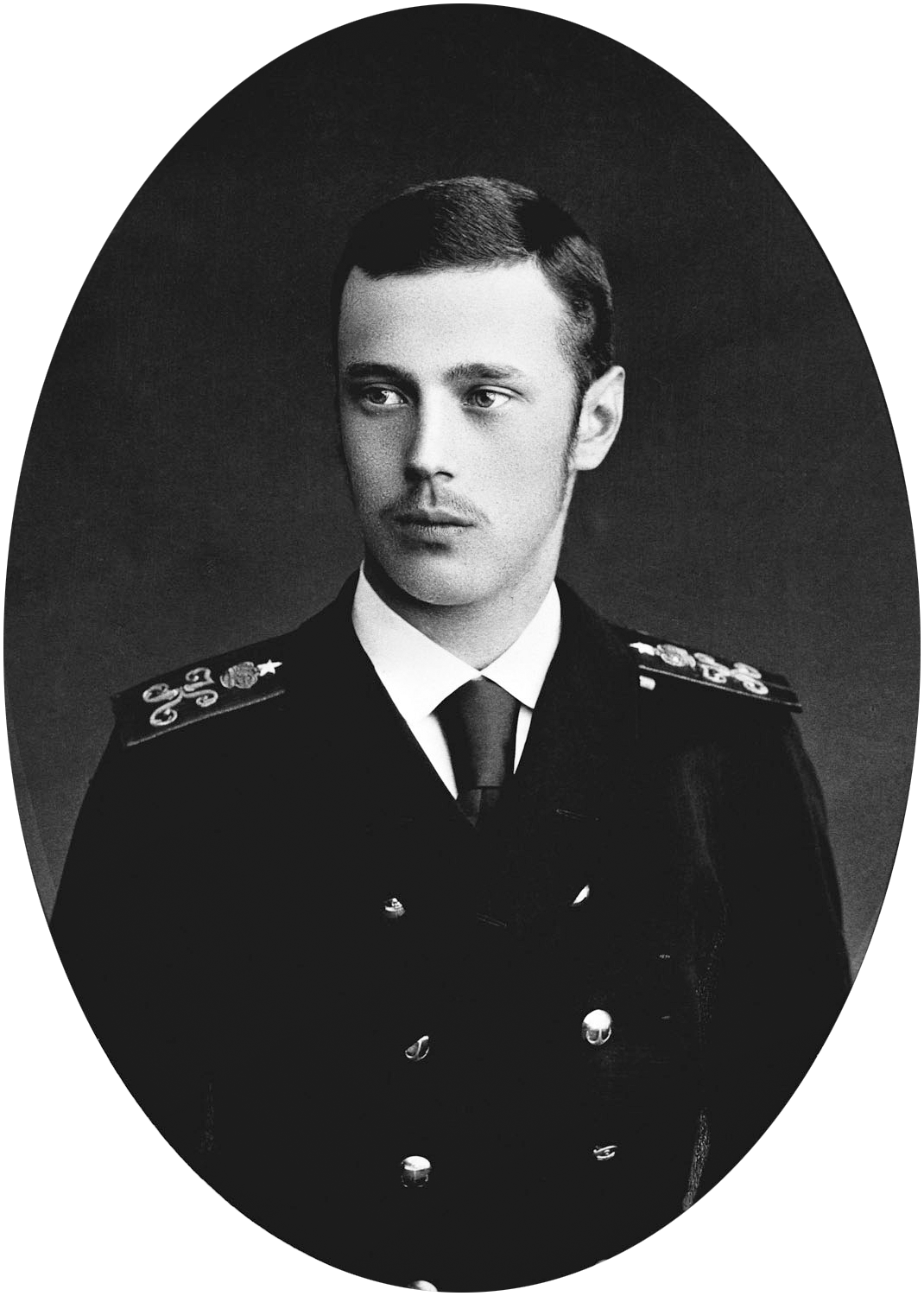
Grand Duke George Alexandrovich in 1889

George died suddenly in Abastumani on 10 July 1899 at the age of 28. He had been out alone on his motorcycle and some hours later, when he failed to return, his worried staff sent out a search party. By the time they found him, a peasant woman had already discovered him collapsed at the side of the road, blood oozing from his mouth as he struggled to breathe. She supported him in her arms until he died.

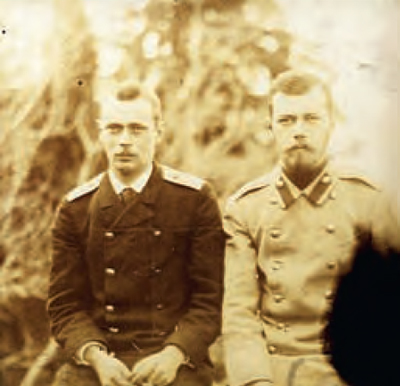
George and his brother Nicholas

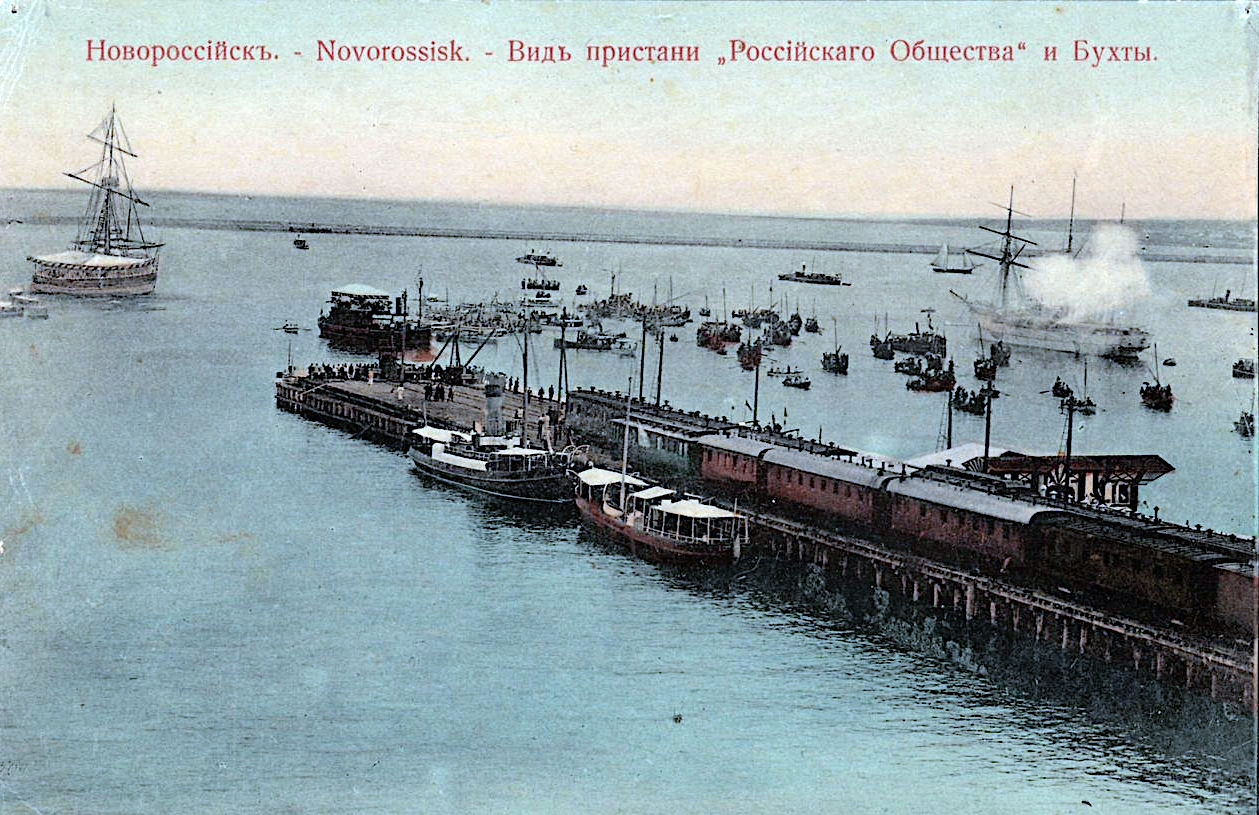
View of the ROPiT pier in the port of Novorossiysk. The moment is captured when the hearse with the body of Prince Georgy Alexandrovich was brought on the battleship Georgii Pobedonosets, accompanied by numerous boats and yachts. The funeral train standing at the ROPiT pier is to take the body by rail to St. Petersburg

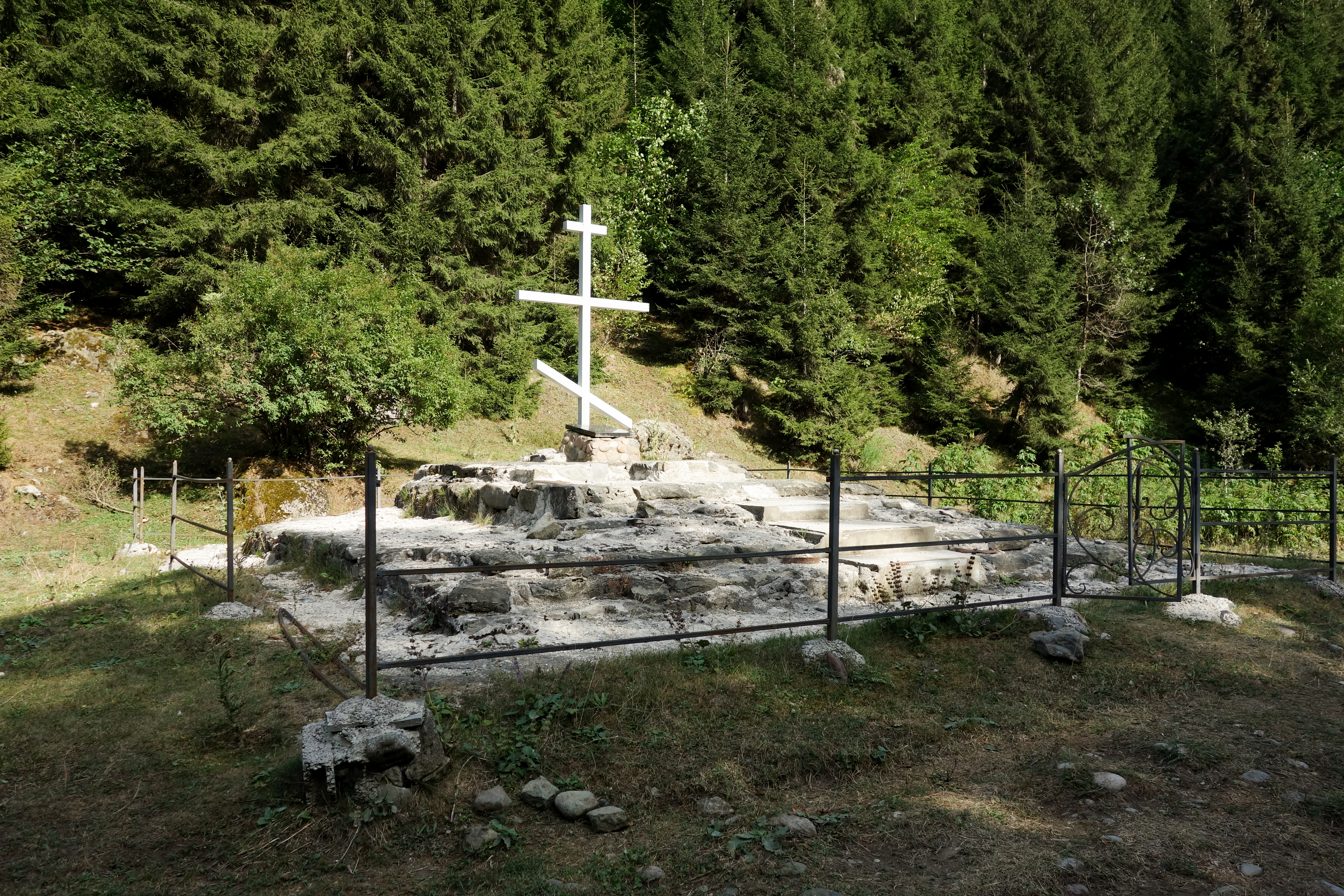
Site of the death of George Alexandrovich in Abastumani, Georgia

The news reached Nicholas by telegram, who had the difficult task of telling their family. Grand Duke Konstantin Konstantinovich wrote, "Everyone was struck, as if by lightning, by this sad and unexpected news. Queen Victoria wrote to Nicholas II, "Pray to accept the expression of my sincerest sympathy in this great sorrow, for I know the affection you had for your poor brother Georgy, whose life was so sad and lonely." The Dowager Empress telegraphed Queen Victoria, "Thank you so much for kind sympathy in this terrible sudden bereavement... My poor dearest son died quite alone. I am heartbroken."

On 14 July 1899 George was buried in the St. Peter and Paul Cathedral in Saint Petersburg, not far from his father, Alexander III. When the coffin was lowered into the tomb, Maria Feodorovna stood next to Xenia holding her arm-in-arm, but quickly left the service as a result of her grief. Maria retrieved George's hat and took it with her as she left in-carriage.

== Legacy ==
George's title as heir presumptive was passed to his younger brother Michael until the birth of Nicholas' son Alexei in 1904. In 1910 Michael named his newborn son George after his late brother.

== DNA evidence ==
Decades later, George's body was disinterred from the grave in the Cathedral of St. Peter and Paul so that a sample of DNA could be taken from his remains to determine whether some unidentified skeletal remains belonged to his older brother, Nicholas II. The DNA sample obtained from the Grand Duke's remains indicated that he was closely related to the DNA sample from the other remains, confirming their identity. After the completion of DNA testing, the remains of Grand Duke George Alexandrovich were once again laid to rest not far from those of his older brother and family.

== Honours ==
- Russian Empire: Knight of St. Andrew
- Austria-Hungary: Grand Cross of St. Stephen, 1885
- Denmark:
  - Knight of the Elephant, 9 October 1889
  - Commemorative Medal for the Golden Wedding of King Christian IX and Queen Louise, 1892
- Empire of Japan: Grand Cordon of the Order of the Chrysanthemum, 14 May 1891
- German Empire: Knight of the Black Eagle, 16 September 1884
  - Hesse and by Rhine: Grand Cross of the Ludwig Order, 10 March 1889
- Spain: Knight of the Golden Fleece, 22 April 1896
