= Moltke (disambiguation) =

Moltke is a noble family resident in Germany and Scandinavia.

Moltke may also refer to:

== People ==
- Erik Moltke (1901–1984), Danish art historian
- Helmuth James Graf von Moltke (1907–1945), German jurist involved in the 1944 assassination attempt against Hitler
- Helmuth von Moltke the Elder (1800–1891), Chief of the Prussian, and then German, General Staff
- Helmuth von Moltke the Younger (1848–1916), Chief of the German General Staff
- Joachim Godske Moltke (1746–1818), Prime Minister of Denmark
- Kuno von Moltke (1847–1923), German general
- Adam Moltke (disambiguation)

== Places ==
- Moltke Harbor, South Georgia Island
- Moltke, Ontario, a township in Canada
- Moltke's Palace, alternate name for Amalienborg Palace, the winter home of the Danish royal family
- Moltke Township (disambiguation), several places in the USA

== Transportation ==
- Moltke (1870), a three-masted barque built in Hamburg, Germany in 1870
- SS Moltke, a German ocean liner launched in 1901.
- SMS Moltke, two German ships named after Moltke the Elder
- Moltke-class battlecruiser, a class of battlecruiser in the German Navy

== Other uses ==
- Moltke (crater), a crater on the Moon
