= Danish palaces =

Danish Palaces or Danish palaces may refer to:

- Danish Palaces (Fabergé egg)
- List of Danish royal residences
- List of castles and palaces in Denmark
