= Egelund House =

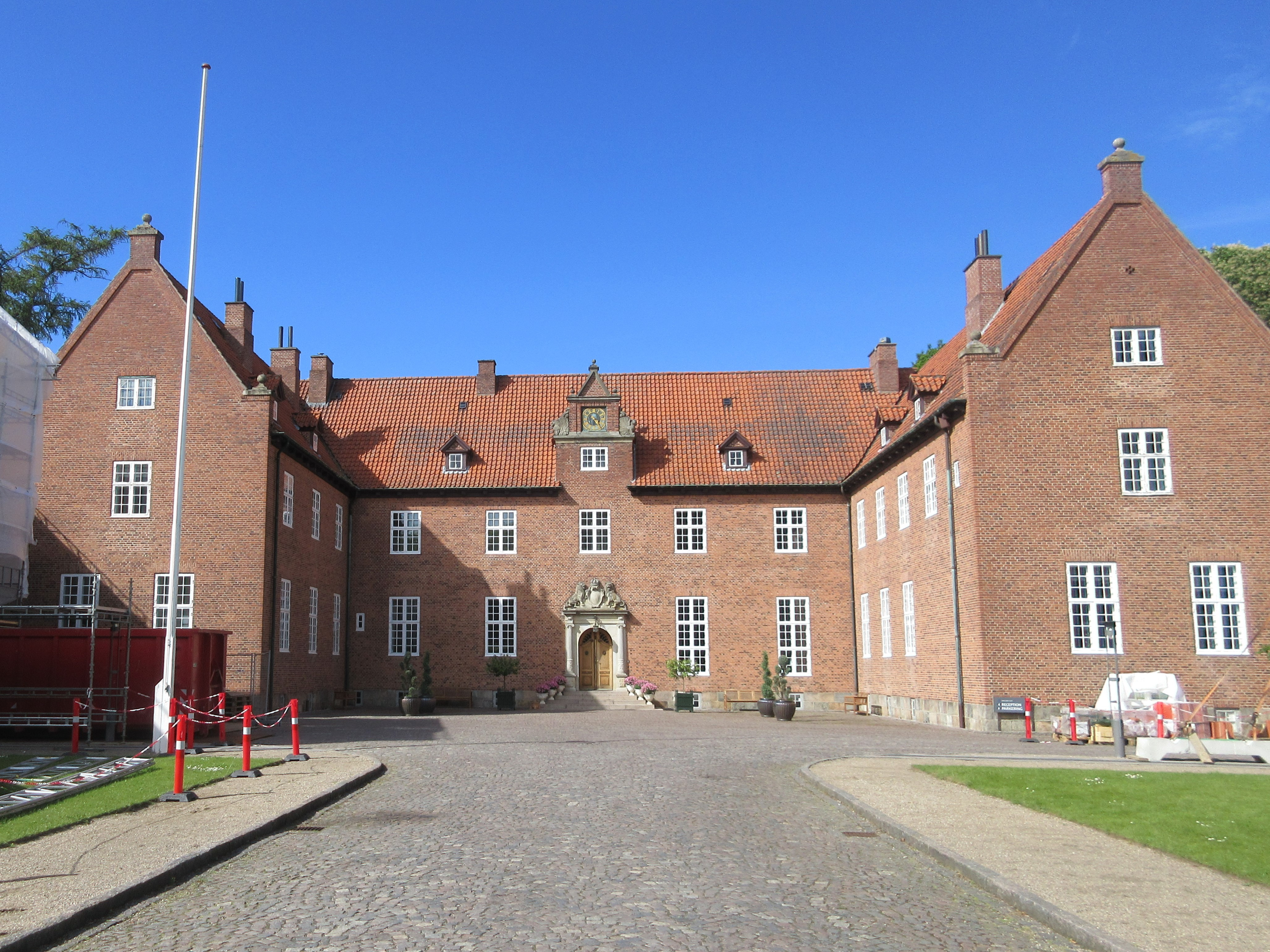
- Interactive map of the Egelund House area

General information
- Architectural style: National Romantic style
- Location: Hillerød Municipality, Denmark
- Coordinates: 55.9606°N 12.3492°E
- Construction started: 1915
- Completed: 1917
- Client: Queen Dowager Louise Josephine

Design and construction
- Architect: Carl Harild

Egelund House (Danish: Egelund Slot) is a former royal residence built by Queen Dowager Louise from 1915 to 1917 on the road between Hillerød and Fredensborg, near the village of Nødebo and the southern tip of Lake Esrom, 35 km north of Copenhagen, Denmark. Today it is owned by Dansk Arbejdsgiverforening and used as a congress and training centre.

== History ==
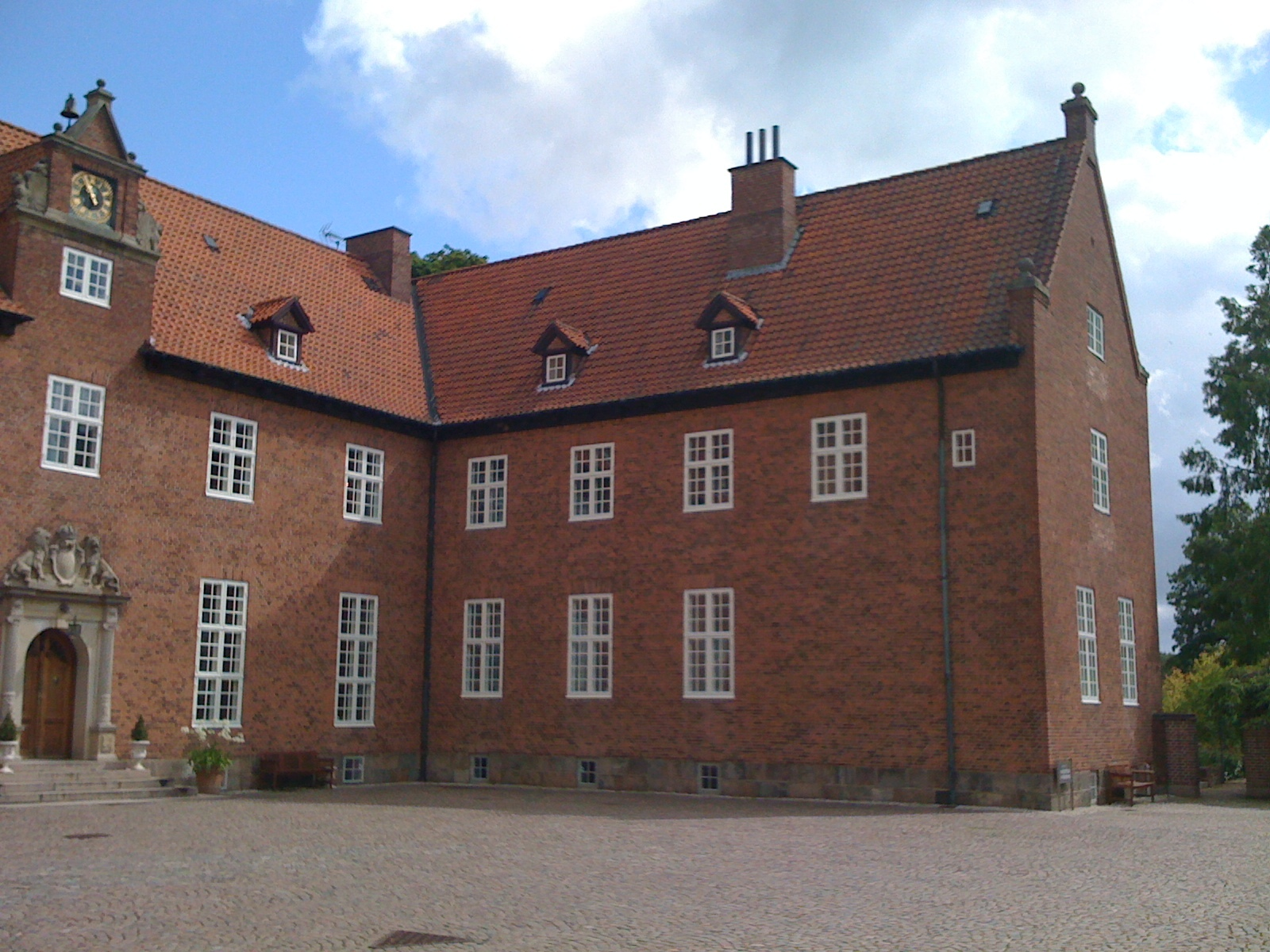
Egelund.

Queen Louise, consort of King Frederik VIII of Denmark, was widowed in 1912. From 1915 to 1917 the house was built and she took up residence there.

The architect was Carl Harild and the garden was designed by landscape architect Edvard Glæsel and later J. P. Andersen as well as Egelund's resident gardener Hansen. After the queen's death in 1926, the property was inherited by Prince Gustav of Denmark, who remained unmarried and had no children. After his death in 1944, the estate passed to Knud, Hereditary Prince of Denmark and Princess Caroline-Mathilde of Denmark. In 1954 Dansk Arbejdsgiverforening bought Egelund from the heirs to use it as a congress and training venue.

== See also ==
- Residences of the Danish monarch
