= List of Danish royal residences =

The Danish royal family inhabit a range of residences around Denmark. Historically all the residences of the royal family were privately owned. With the introduction of the new Constitution in 1849, some of the residences were claimed as property of the "Kingdom of Denmark". Some of the palaces are still privately owned by the King or other members of the royal family. The Agency for Palaces and Cultural Properties (the Danish equivalent of the Historic Royal Palaces agency) is responsible for the management and upkeep of some of the royal palaces and gardens.

The Danish royal family traditionally occupy different royal residences during different seasons of the year. In summer, King Frederik resides at Marselisborg Palace or Graasten Palace. In the winter, he resides at Amalienborg, whereas his residence during spring and autumn is Fredensborg Palace. Sometimes members of the royal family spend time on the Royal Yacht Dannebrog, especially when on official visits overseas and on summer cruises in Danish waters.

== Palaces ==
=== Amalienborg Palace ===
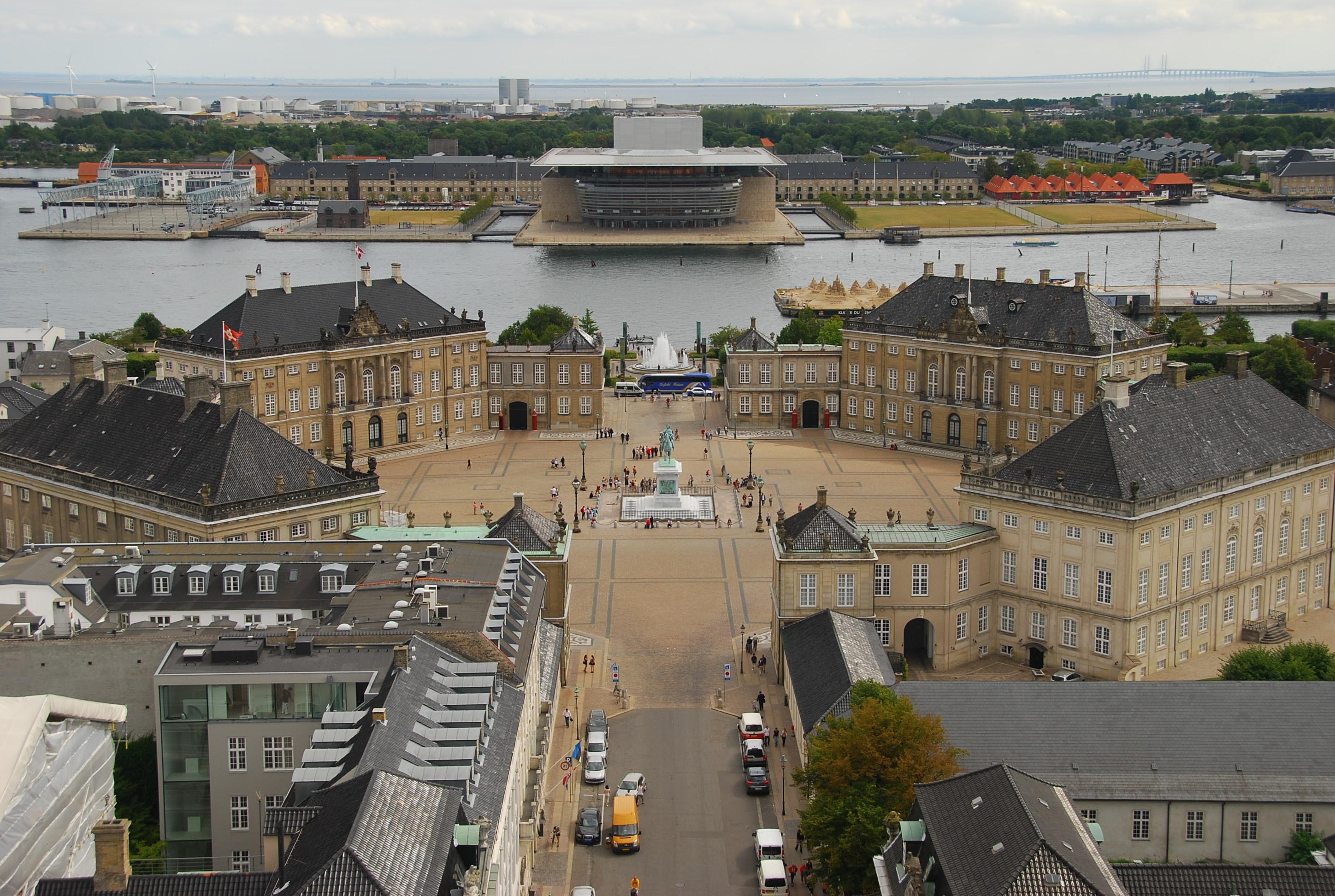
Amalienborg Palace

Amalienborg Palace is the winter home and main residence of the monarch, and is located in Copenhagen, Denmark. It consists of four identical classicizing palace façades with rococo interiors around an octagonal courtyard; in the centre of the square is a monumental equestrian statue of Amalienborg's founder, King Frederik V.

Amalienborg was originally built for four noble families; however, when Christiansborg Palace burnt down on 26 February 1794, the royal family bought the palaces and moved in. Over the years various kings and their families have resided in the four different palaces. Currently, Frederik X and Queen Mary of Denmark reside in Frederik VIII's Palace while Queen Margrethe II resides in Christian IX's Palace. Christian VIII's Palace has apartments for other members of the royal family, whereas Christian VII's Palace is used for official events and to accommodate guests.

=== Christiansborg Palace ===
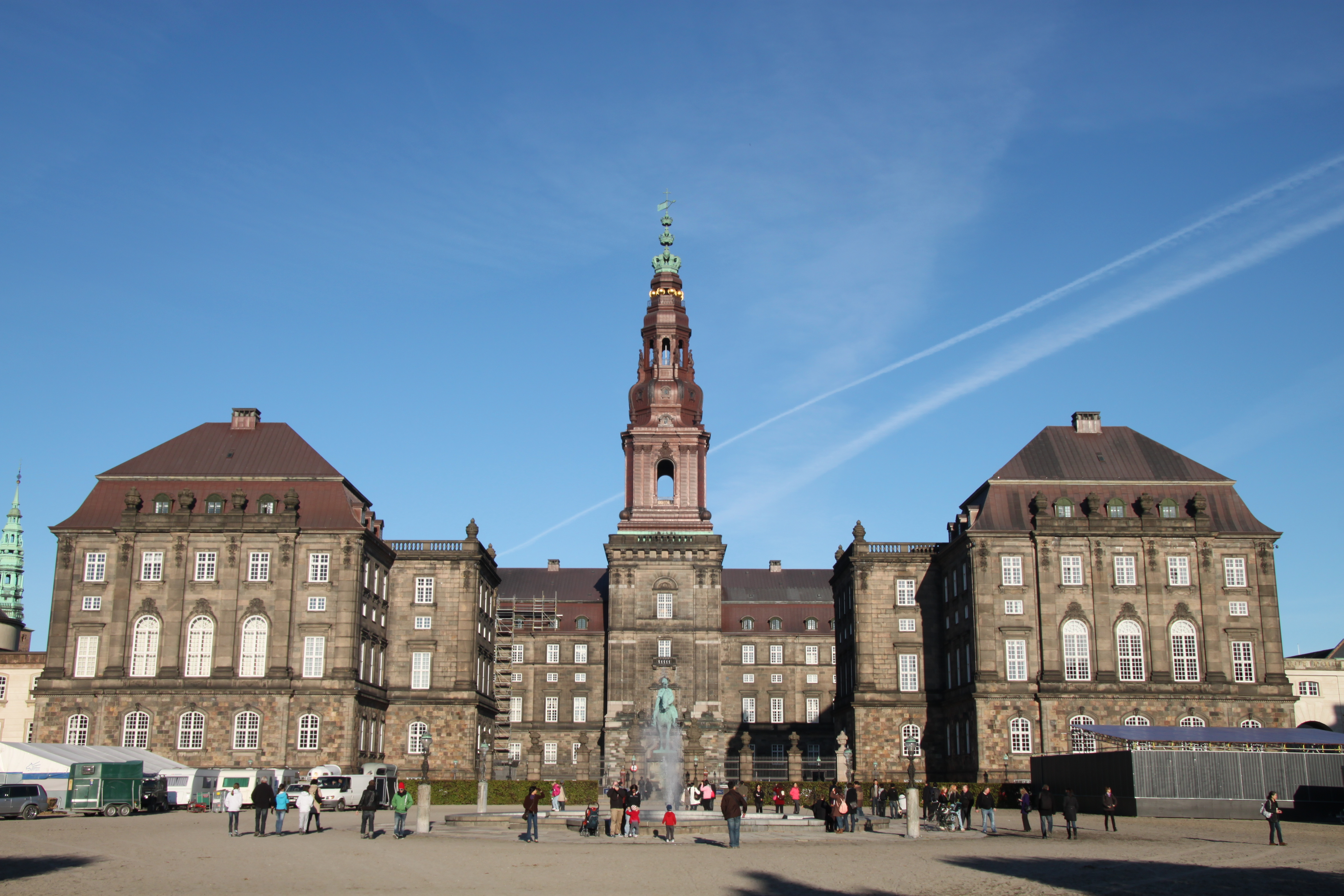
Christiansborg Palace

Historically, Christiansborg Palace in Copenhagen was the main residence of the Danish kings. But after the fire of the first Christiansborg Palace in 1794, the royal family moved their residence to Amalienborg. However, even though the royal family does not reside in the palace, parts of Christiansborg have continued to be used by the monarch for official purposes and state ceremonies. It is the site of public audiences, meetings of the Council of State, state dinners, receptions and other ceremonies. Also, the Royal Stables which provide the ceremonial transport by horse-drawn carriage for the royal family, are located here. The state apartments of the royal palace are open to the public when they are not in use for official purposes.

=== Fredensborg Palace ===
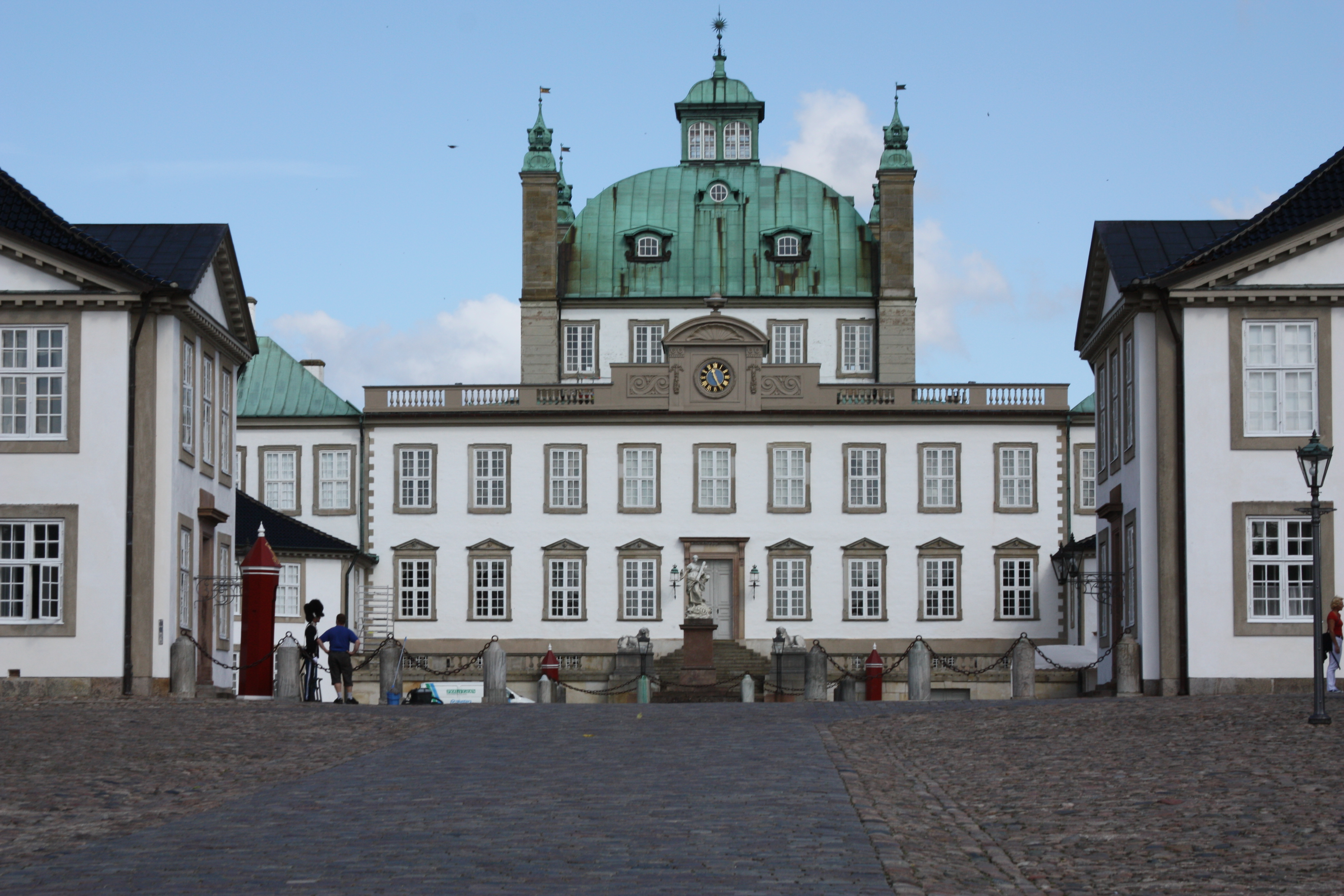
Fredensborg Palace

Fredensborg Palace is a palace located on the eastern shore of Lake Esrum (Danish, Esrum Sø) in Fredensborg on the island of Zealand (Sjælland) in Denmark. It is the Danish royal family’s spring and autumn residence, and is often the site of important state visits and events in the royal family. It is the most used of the royal family's residences.

=== Marselisborg Palace ===
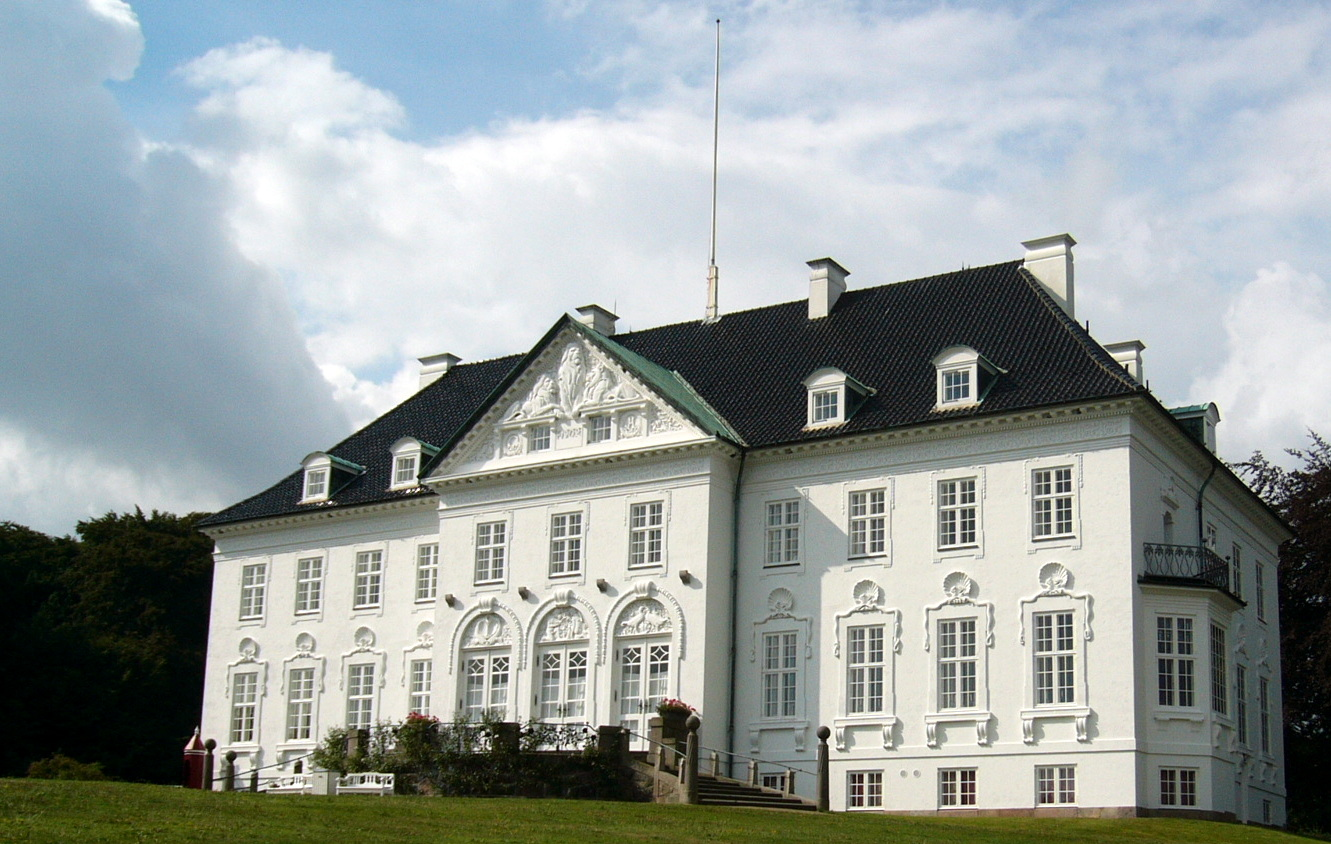
Marselisborg Palace

Marselisborg Palace is the summer residence of the royal family in Aarhus. Historically, the grounds was the property of the Marselis dynasty, its namesake. Marselisborg became a royal residence when Crown Prince Christian (later Christian X) and his consort Princess Alexandrine were given the palace as a wedding present by the people of Denmark. As such the palace is private property of the Queen, but will remain in possession of all future monarchs of Denmark. The royal couple used it as their summer residence. The building was built by the Danish architect Hack Kampmann. Queen Margrethe II was given the palace by her father, King Frederik IX of Denmark in 1967.

=== Gråsten Palace ===
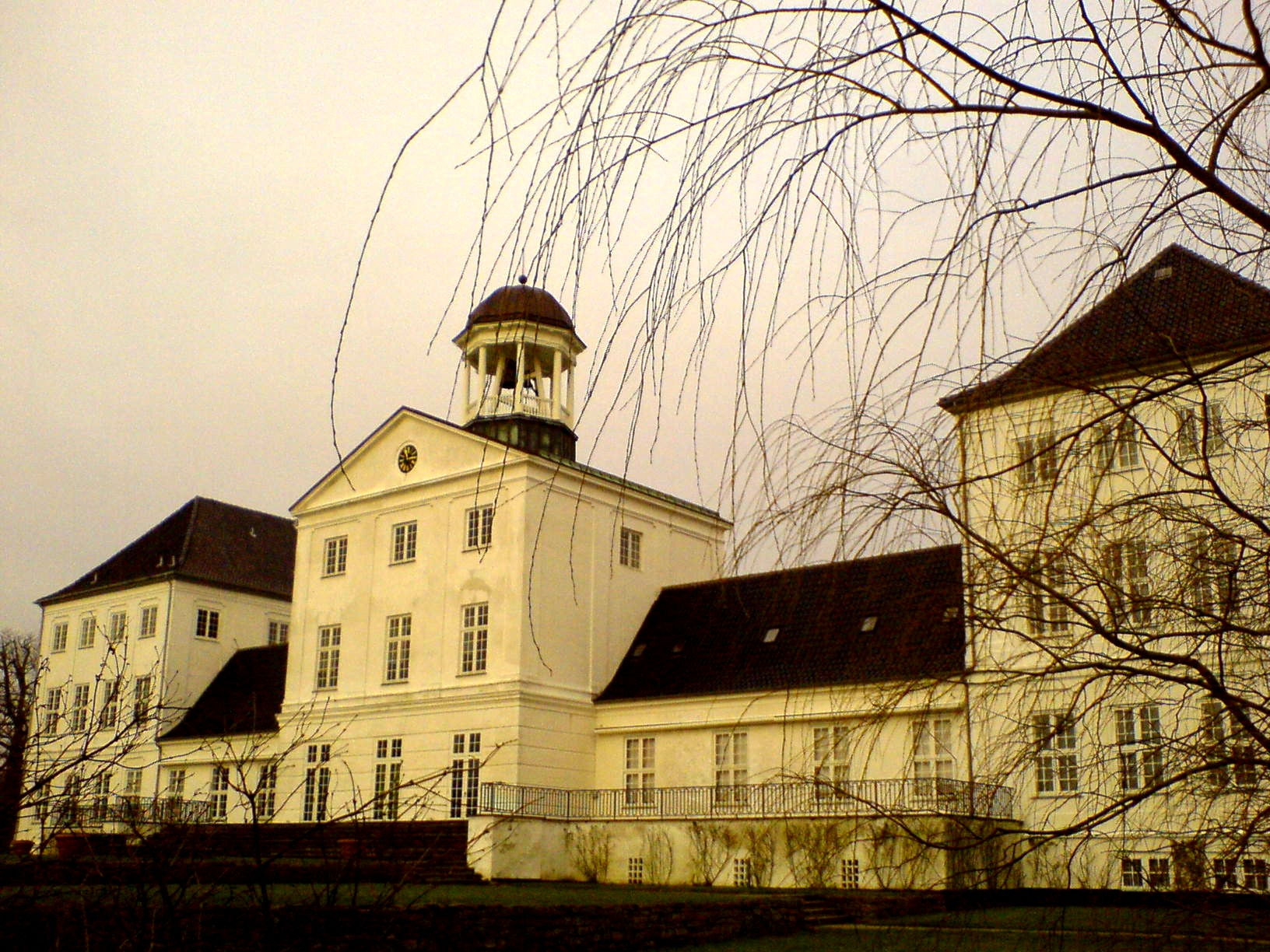
Gråsten Palace

Gråsten Palace is the second summer residence of the Danish royal family. It is located in Gråsten in the Region of Southern Denmark. The main house has a modern, all-white façade, with Venetian doors opening onto sweeping, manicured lawns and gravel walkways. The grounds include a huge stables court. Known for the setting for holiday photocalls for the extended Danish royal family and descendants of Queen Ingrid.

=== Hermitage Lodge ===
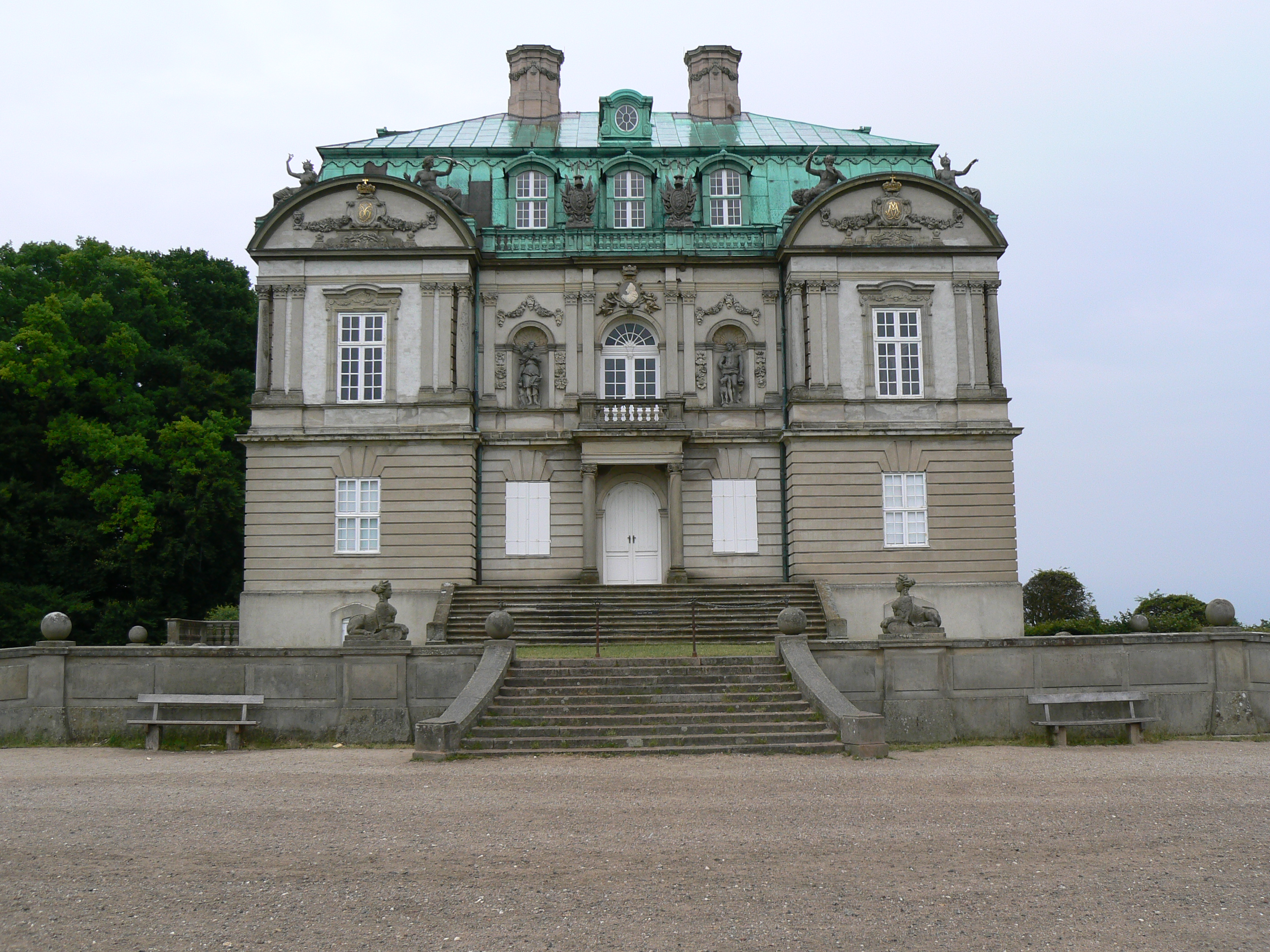
Hermitage Lodge

The Eremitage Hunting Lodge (Danish: Eremitageslottet or Eremitagen) is located in Dyrehaven north of Copenhagen, Denmark. It was built by architect Lauritz de Thurah in Baroque style from 1734 to 1736 for Christian VI of Denmark in order to host banquets during royal hunts in Dyrehaven.

Never intended for residence, the Eremitage was built as a setting for hosting royal banquets during hunts in Dyrehaven, which surrounds the building. It originally featured a hoisting apparatus able to raise the table from the basement to the dining room, allowing the king and his guests to dine without any waiters present, or "en ermitage" (in solitude), hence the name of the castle. The apparatus was removed in the late 18th century as it was causing endless mechanical problems, and no signs of it remain. The previous building on the site, the Hubertus Chalet, had a similar apparatus and was nicknamed Heremitagen for the same reason.

=== Sorgenfri Palace ===
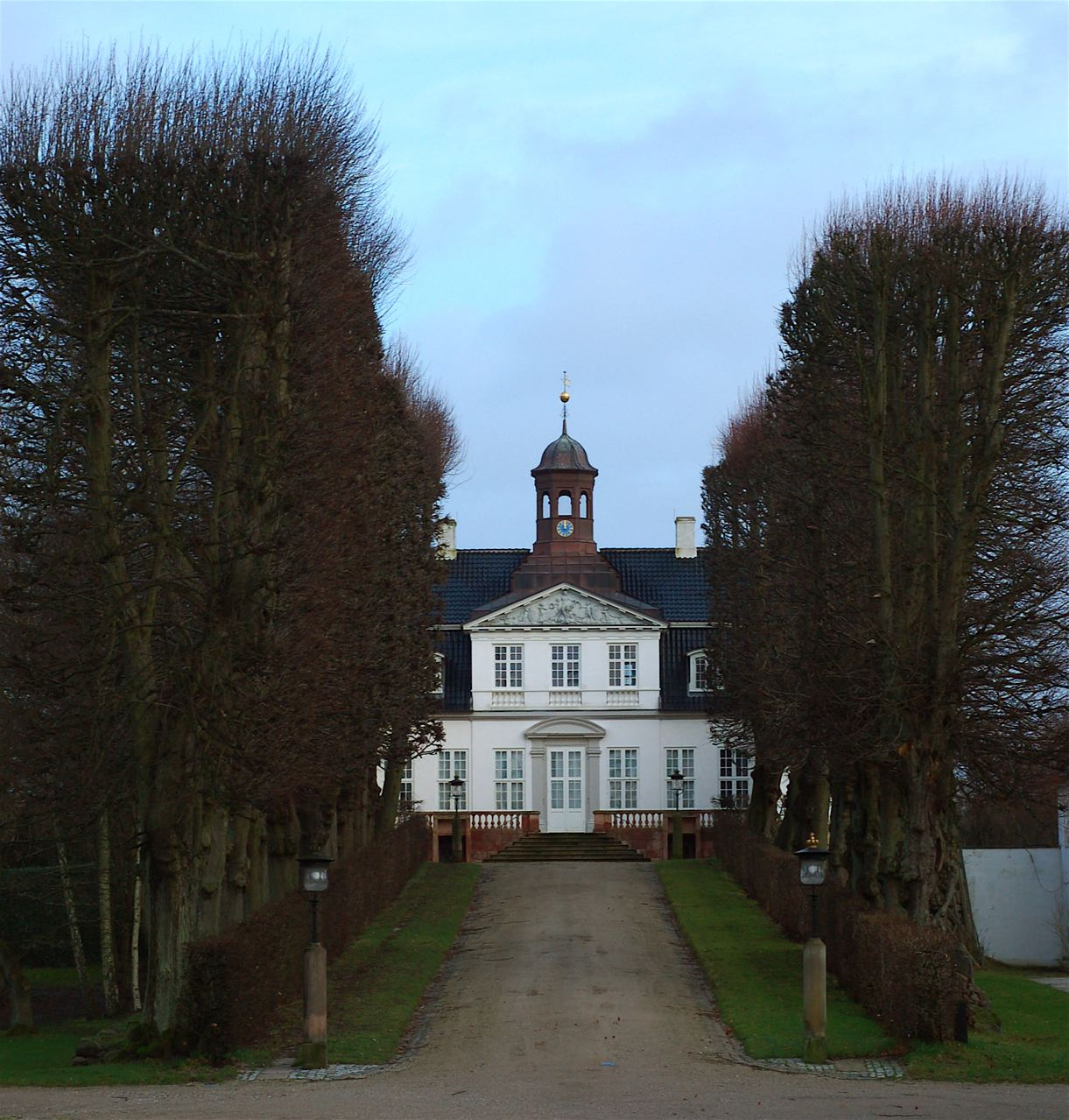
Sorgenfri Palace

Sorgenfri Palace is a royal residence of the Danish monarch located in the Lyngby-Taarbæk municipality in Greater Copenhagen. Originally a country seat, Sorgenfri Palace was built for the Danish nobleman Count Carl Ahlefeldt in 1706. The palace first became a royal residence in 1730 after coming into the possession of the Danish royal family.

Sorgenfri was the preferred summer residence of King Christian X and his wife Queen Alexandrine. Both of Alexandrine's children Frederik and his brother, Knud, were born there. Both Knud and his wife Caroline-Mathilde lived at Sorgenfri Palace until their respective deaths in 1976 and 1995.

Today the palace is closed to the public but the palace gardens are accessible when the monarch is not in residence. Countess Anne-Dorte, the widow of Count Christian of Rosenborg (a younger son of Prince Knud), resided in a wing of the palace until her death .

=== Château de Cayx ===
Château de Cayx is a residence of the Danish royal family located in the wine district of Cahors in southern France.

The château was first fortified during the fourteenth century. Since then it has been rebuilt and renovated several times. The Lefrancs built the extensive wine cellars under the château.

The phylloxera infestation devastated the vineyards during the late nineteenth century, and the owners emigrated to Indo-China. They did not return to Europe until 1955. In 1967 the family's heir, Henri Marie Jean André de Laborde de Monpezat, married Princess Margrethe, then heiress presumptive to the Danish throne, becoming Prince Consort of Denmark after she succeeded to Denmark's throne.

The royal couple purchased the château and the estate in 1974. Since then they have renovated it extensively. According to the official website of the Danish monarchy, the residence has become a "relaxed setting for reunions of the entire Danish Royal Family and their French relatives". It has been the setting for holiday photocalls for the Danish royal family, including for Prince Henrik's 80th birthday.

The residence is not open to the public. A guided tour of the gardens is available during the summer. The château still produces wine.

== See also ==
- List of castles and palaces in Denmark
- List of historic houses in Denmark
