= Prince Gustav of Denmark =

Danish prince (1887–1944)

Prince Gustav
- Gustav in 1911
- Born: 4 March 1887; Charlottenlund Palace, Copenhagen, Denmark
- Died: 5 October 1944 (aged 57); Egelund Palace, Copenhagen, Denmark
- Burial: Roskilde Cathedral
Names
- Christian Frederik Wilhelm Valdemar Gustav
- House: Glücksburg
- Father: Frederik VIII of Denmark
- Mother: Louise of Sweden

Prince Gustav of Denmark (Christian Frederik Vilhelm Valdemar Gustav; 4 March 1887 – 5 October 1944) was a member of the Danish royal family. He was the fourth and youngest son and seventh child of King Frederik VIII and Queen Louise.

== Early life ==
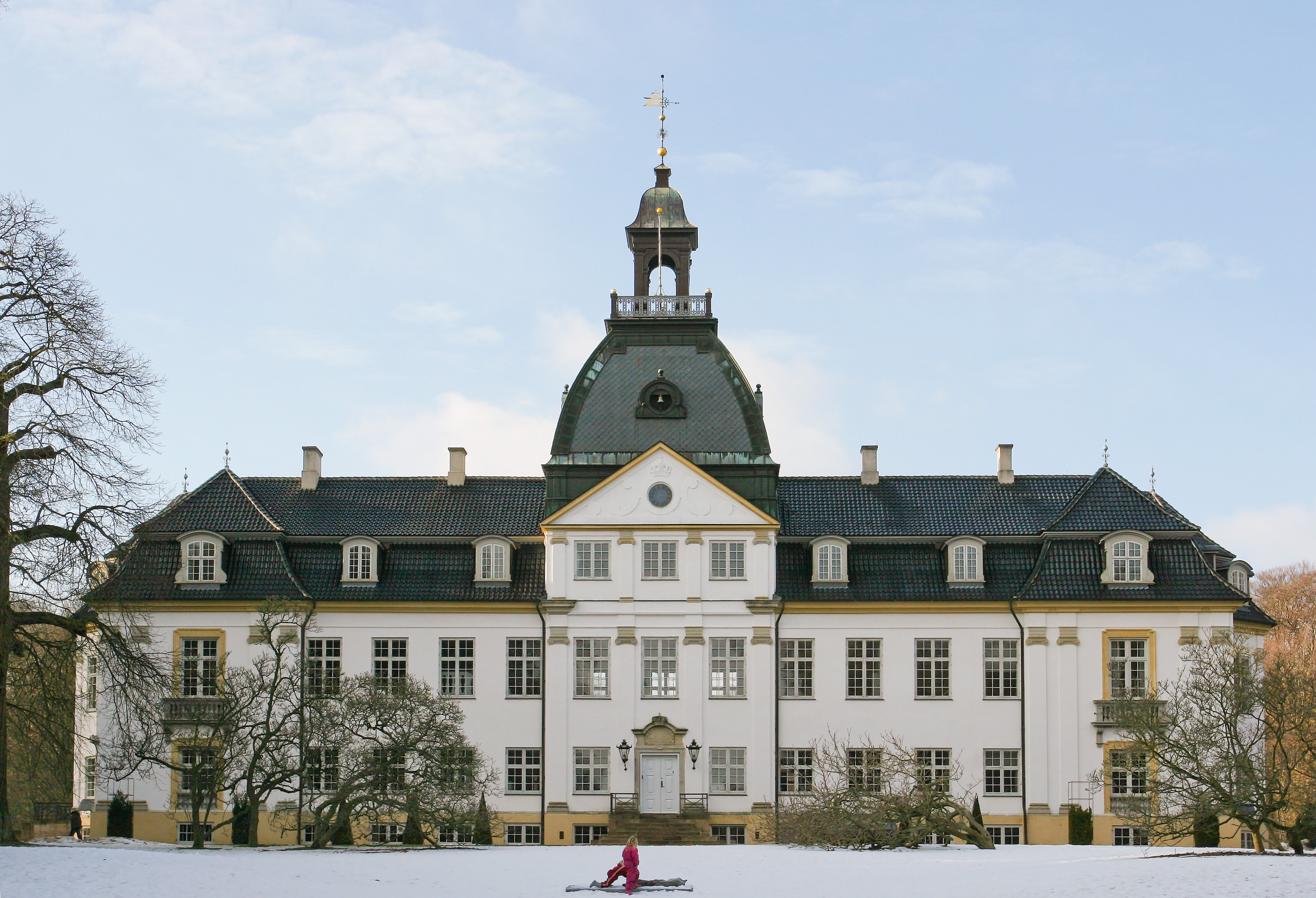
Prince Gustav's birthplace, Charlottenlund Palace, photographed in 2006

Prince Gustav was born on 4 March 1887 at his parents' country residence, the Charlottenlund Palace north of Copenhagen, during the reign of his paternal grandfather, King Christian IX. He was the seventh child and fourth son of Crown Prince Frederik of Denmark and his wife Louise of Sweden. His father was the eldest son of King Christian IX and Louise of Hesse-Kassel, and his mother was the only daughter of King Charles XV of Sweden and Norway and Louise of the Netherlands. He was baptised with the names Christian Frederik Wilhelm Valdemar Gustav, and was known as Prince Gustav.

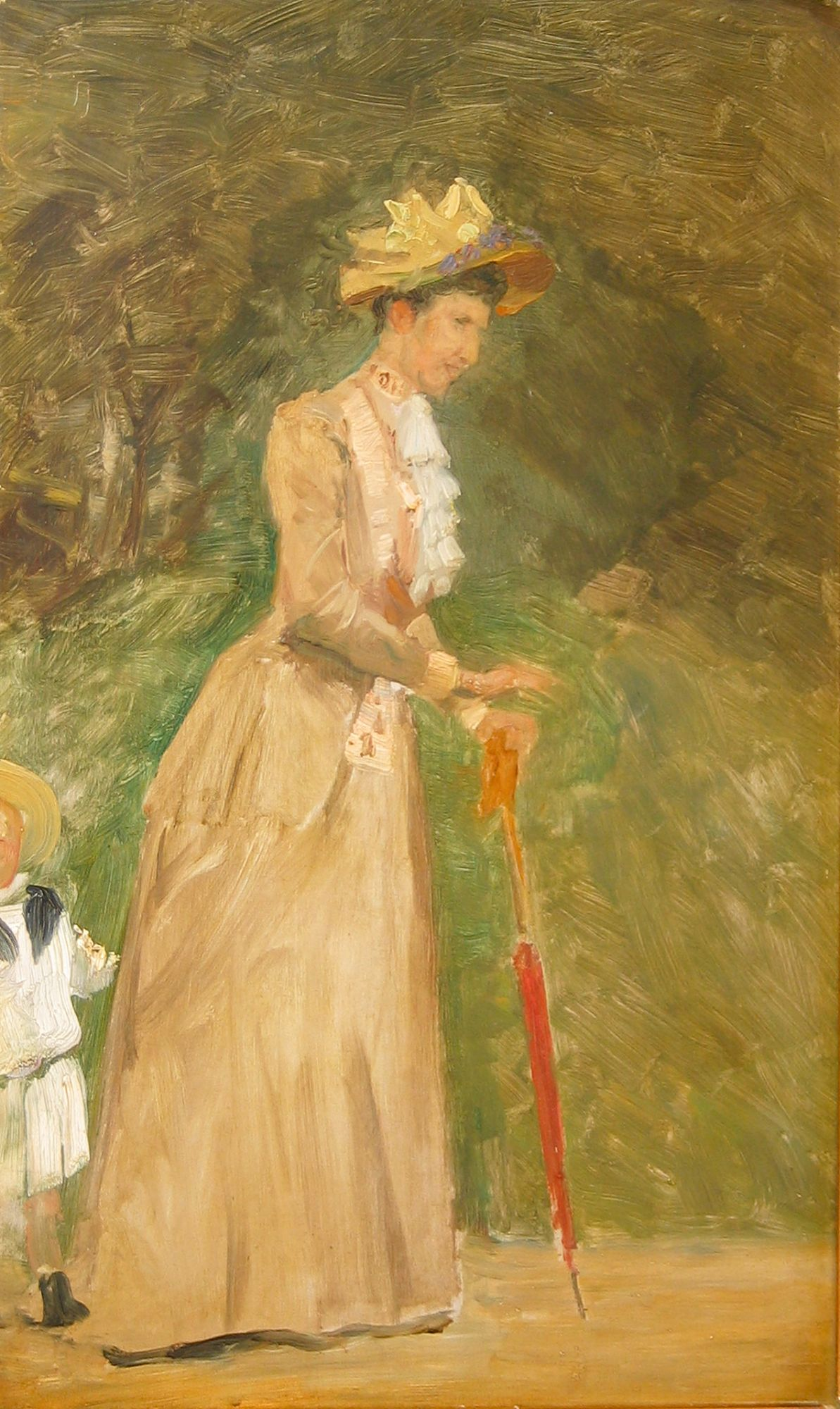
Crown Princess Louise and Prince Gustav. Painting by August Jerndorff (about 1890)

Prince Gustav was raised with his siblings in the royal household in Denmark and grew up between his parents' residence in Copenhagen, the Frederik VIII's Palace at the Amalienborg Palace complex, and their country retreat, the Charlottenlund Palace, located by the coastline of the Øresund strait north of the city.

Prince Gustav remained unmarried and had no children.

== Later life ==
On 2 February 1935 in the Russian Orthodox Church in Copenhagen he was, together with his cousin Grand Duchess Olga Alexandrovna of Russia and her husband colonel Nikolai Kulikovsky, a godparent at the christening of Alexander Schalburg, son of first lieutenant in the Royal Danish Life Guards and a leading figure of the Danish Waffen-SS unit Free Corps Denmark, Christian Frederik von Schalburg.

Prince Gustav died on 5 October 1944 at his estate Egelund House north of Copenhagen in North Zealand, Denmark.

== Title, style and honours ==
=== Title and style ===
- 4 March 1887 – 5 October 1944: His Royal Highness Prince Gustav of Denmark

=== Honours ===
- Denmark:
  - Commemorative Medal for King Christian IX and Queen Louise's Golden Wedding Anniversary, 1892
  - Knight of the Elephant, 4 March 1905
  - Cross of Honour of the Order of the Dannebrog, 4 March 1905
  - Commemorative Medal for King Christian IX's 100th Birthday, 1918
  - Commemorative Medal for King Frederik VIII's 100th Birthday, 1943
- Belgium: Grand Cordon of the Royal Order of Leopold, 20 April 1928
- France: Grand Cross of the Legion of Honour
- German Empire:
  - Knight of the Black Eagle
  - Grand Cross of the Red Eagle
  - (Saxe-Coburg and Gotha) (Duchy of Saxe-Altenburg) (Saxe-Meiningen) Ernestine duchies: Grand Cross of the Saxe-Ernestine House Order
  - Mecklenburg: Grand Cross of the Wendish Crown, with Crown in Ore
- Kingdom of Greece: Grand Cross of the Redeemer
- Norway:
  - Grand Cross of St. Olav, with Collar, 6 October 1906
  - King Haakon VII Freedom Medal
- Sweden: Knight of the Seraphim, 11 September 1906
- Thailand: Grand Cordon of the Order of Chula Chom Klao
- United Kingdom: Honorary Grand Cross of the Royal Victorian Order, 23 April 1908

== Ancestry ==
Ancestors of Prince Gustav of Denmark

8. Friedrich Wilhelm, Duke of Schleswig-Holstein-Sonderburg-Glücksburg
4. Christian IX of Denmark
9. Princess Louise Caroline of Hesse-Kassel
2. Frederik VIII of Denmark
10. Prince William of Hesse-Kassel
5. Princess Louise of Hesse-Kassel
11. Princess Charlotte of Denmark
1. Prince Gustav of Denmark
12. Oscar I of Sweden
6. Charles XV of Sweden
13. Princess Josephine of Leuchtenberg
3. Princess Louise of Sweden
14. Prince Frederick of the Netherlands
7. Princess Louise of the Netherlands
15. Princess Louise of Prussia
