= Johann Christoph Petzold =

German sculptor

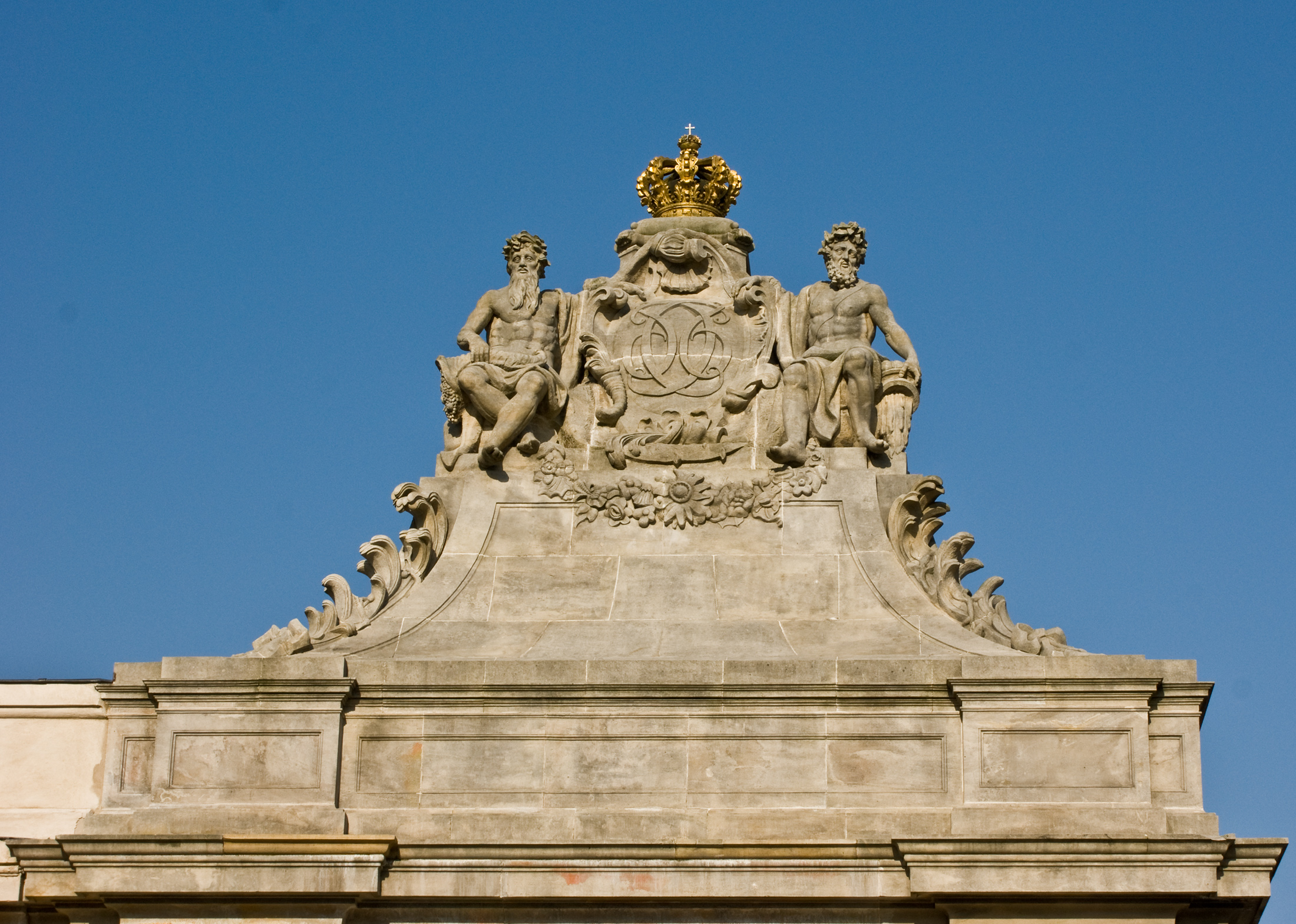
Detail from one of the Marble Bridge pavilions

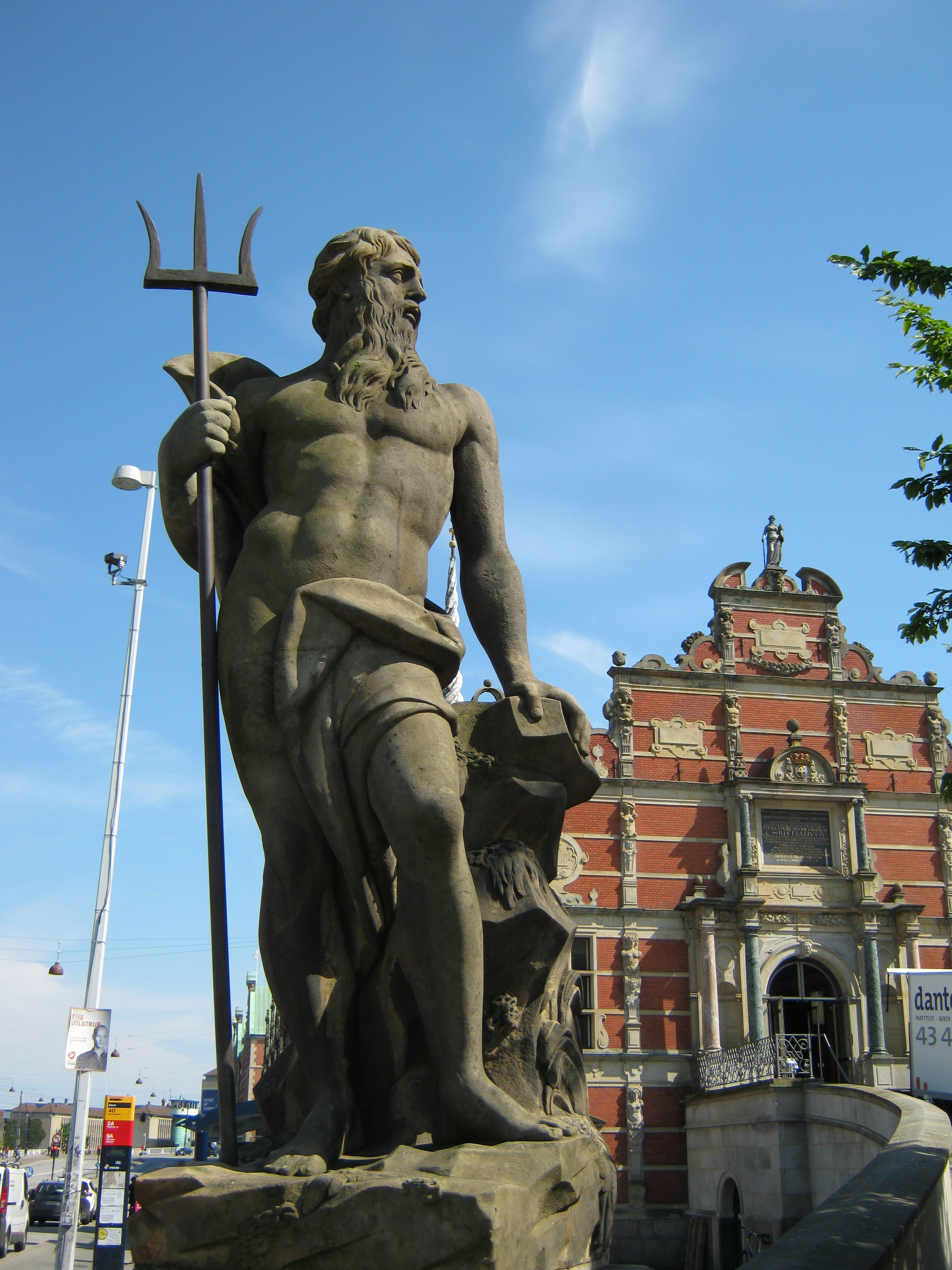
Petzold's Neptune statue at Børsen in Copenhagen

Johan Christoph Petzold (5 October 1708 - 15 September 1762) was a German sculptor who mainly worked in Denmark. He was a professor at the Royal Danish Academy of Fine Arts from its establishment in 1754 and briefly held the post of Sculptor to the Danish Court.

== Biography ==
Born in Wünschendorf near Pirna, Saxony, Petzold had his training with Balthasar Permoser in Dresden, Andreas Schlüter in Berlin and Georg Rafael Donner in Vienna.

He worked in Denmark from 1739 until 1757 interrupted by a one and a half year period from 1746 to October 1748 when he worked at the castle in Potsdam. His first work in Denmark, a relief for a pediment and a statue at the naval headquarters at Gammelholm in Copenhagen, from 1739–40, was lost in the Great Fire of 1795. Other lost works include seven statues for Hirschholm Palace (1741) and three for Frederiksdalin Lyngby (1745). From 1742, he worked on the sculpture groups of the Marble Bridge' pavilions at Christiansborg Palace and in 1744 and 1745 he created two large statues of Neptune and Mercury at Børsen (the originals are now in the Museum of Copenhagen).

After Petzold's return to Denmark from Berlin, he initially worked on decorations for Christiansborg Palace (1749–50). The most prolific period of his career came in the 1750s when he carried out the rich decorations of the facade of Moltke's Mansion, one of the four Amalienborg mansions, as well as sculpture for Frederiks Hospital. His contributions at the hospital include the relief of the Good Samaritan in the pediment above the main entrance towards Bredgade.

From 1751 he was a professor at the predecessor of the Royal Art Academy and from its opening in 1754 until 1757 at the Art Academy. In 1755 he was appointed Sculptor to the Danish Court. However, Jacques Saly's appointment to director of the Art Academy in 1743 heralded a new era and although Petzold was no stranger to the Neoclassical style, he continued to prefer that of the Rococo. After a few years he gave up his position as professor and left Copenhagen, settling in Altona. He died in Schönfeld where he is also buried.
