= Adam Moltke =

Adam Moltke may refer to:

- Adam Gottlob Moltke (1710–1792), Danish courtier, statesman and diplomat
- Adam Wilhelm Moltke (1785–1864), Prime Minister of Denmark
