= Moltke Township =

Moltke Township may refer to the following townships in the United States:

- Moltke Township, Michigan
- Moltke Township, Sibley County, Minnesota
