= Amalienborg =

Home of the Danish royal family

- The palaces (or mansions) of Amalienborg, surrounding the courtyard (Frederik's Church can be seen in the background)
- Interactive map of the Amalienborg area

General information
- Architectural style: Rococo
- Location: Copenhagen, Denmark
- Coordinates: 55°41′02.5″N 12°35′36″E
- Construction started: 1750
- Completed: 1760

Design and construction
- Architect: Nicolai Eigtved

Amalienborg (Danish pronunciation: [æˈmɛˀljn̩ˌpɒˀ]) is the official residence of the Danish monarch and Danish royal family and is located in Copenhagen. Frederick VIII's palace complex has four identical Classical façades, effectively four palaces, with Rococo interiors, laid around an octagonal courtyard (Danish: Amalienborg Slotsplads). At the centre is a large equestrian statue of Frederick V. Amalienborg was originally built for four noble families, but after Christiansborg Palace burned in 1794 the royal family bought the palaces and moved in. Over the years various monarchs and their families have lived there, including today's King Frederik X and Queen Mary.

== History ==
=== The first palaces on the site ===
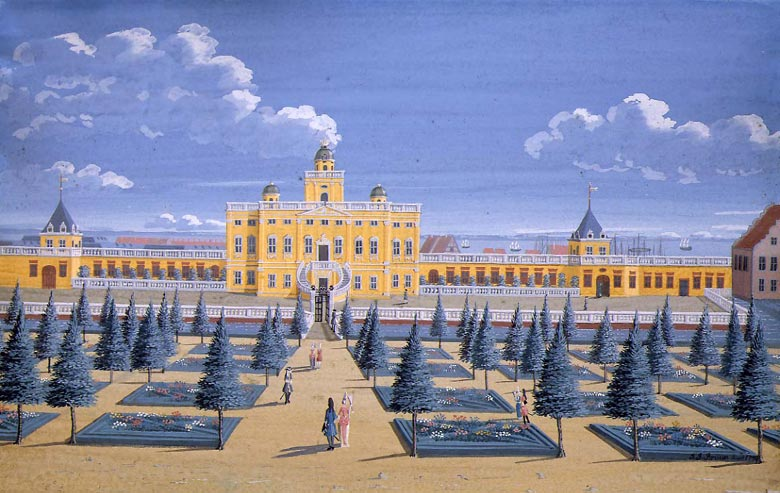
Sophie Amalienborg, gouache by Johan Jacob Bruun (1740)

The Frederiksstaden district was built on the former grounds of two other palaces. The first palace was called Sophie Amalienborg. It was dedicated to Queen Sophie Amalie, consort to Frederick III, on part of the land which her father-in-law Christian IV had acquired outside of Copenhagen's old walled city, now known as the Indre By district, in the early 17th century when he had been king. Other parts of the land were used for Rosenborg Castle, Nyboder, and the new Eastern fortified wall around the old city.

It included a garden, a replacement for the "Queen's Garden" which had been located beyond the city's western gate Vesterport, an area today known as Vesterbro, and which had been destroyed under siege from Sweden in 1659. Work on the garden began in 1664, and the castle was built from 1669 to 1673. The King died in 1670, and the Queen Dowager lived there until her death on February 20, 1685.

Four years later on April 15, 1689, Sophie Amalie's son Christian V celebrated his forty-fourth birthday at the palace with the presentation of a German opera, perhaps the first opera presentation in Denmark, in a specially-built temporary theatre. The presentation was a great success, and it was repeated a few days later on April 19. However, immediately after the start of the second performance a stage decoration caught fire, causing the theatre and the palace to burn to the ground, and about 180 people died.

The King planned to rebuild the palace, whose church, Royal Household and garden buildings were still intact. Ole Rømer headed the preparatory work for the rebuilding of Amalienborg in the early 1690s. In 1694, the King negotiated a deal with the Swedish building master Nicodemus Tessin the Younger, who spent some time in Copenhagen that summer reviewing the property. His drawing and model were completed in 1697. The King, however, found the plans too ambitious and instead began tearing down the existing buildings that same year, with the reclaimed building materials used to build a new Garrison Church.

The second Amalienborg was built by Frederick IV at the beginning of his reign. The second Amalienborg consisted of a summerhouse, a central pavilion with orangeries, and arcades on both side of the pavilion. On one side of the buildings was a French-style garden, and on the other side were military drill grounds. The pavilion had a dining room on the ground floor. On the upper floor was a salon with a view out to the harbour, the garden and the drill grounds.

=== Development of Frederiksstaden by Frederick V ===
Amalienborg is the centrepiece of Frederiksstaden, a district that was launched by King Frederick V to commemorate in 1748 the tercentenary of the Oldenburg family's ascent to the throne of Denmark, and in 1749 the tercentenary of the coronation of Christian I of Denmark. This development is generally thought to have been the brainchild of Danish Ambassador Plenipotentiary in Paris, Johann Hartwig Ernst, Count von Bernstorff. Heading the project was Lord High Steward Adam Gottlob Moltke, one of the most powerful and influential men in the country, with Nicolai Eigtved as royal architect and supervisor.

The project consisted of four identical mansions, built to house four distinguished families of nobility from the royal circles, placed around an octagonal square. These mansions (now called Palaces) form the modern palace of Amalienborg, albeit much modified over the years.

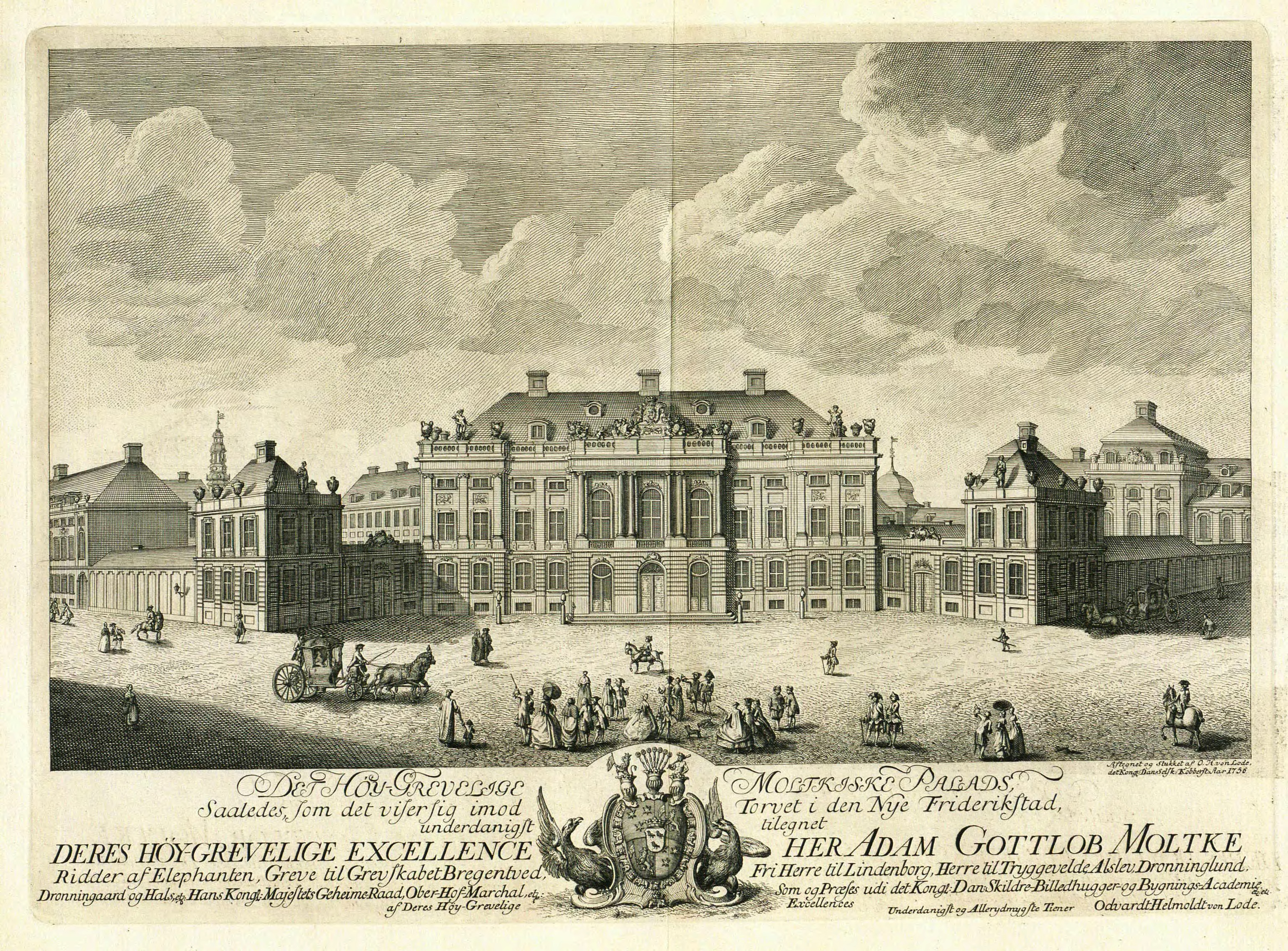
Moltke's Palace in 1756

=== As a royal residence ===
When the Royal Family found themselves homeless after the Christiansborg Palace fire of 1794, the palaces were empty for long periods throughout the year, with the exception of the Brockdorff Palace, which housed the Naval Academy. The noblemen who owned them were willing to part with their mansions for promotion and money, and the Moltke and Schack Palaces were acquired in the course of a few days. Since that date successive royal family members have lived at Amalienborg as a royal residence and kings have lent their names to the four palaces; Christian VII's Palace, Christian VIII's Palace, Frederik VIII's Palace and Christian IX's Palace.

A colonnade, designed by royal architect Caspar Frederik Harsdorff, was added in 1794–1795 to connect the recently occupied King's palace, Moltke Palace, with that of the Crown Prince, Schack's Palace.

On the morning of 9 April 1940, the day of the German invasion of Denmark during World War II, Amalienborg palace was the site of an hour-long firefight between the Danish Royal Life Guards and the 2nd Battalion of 308th Infantry Regiment of the German 198th Infantry Division. The firefight ended after Christian X of Denmark called for a ceasefire to spare his country from destruction.

== The four palaces ==
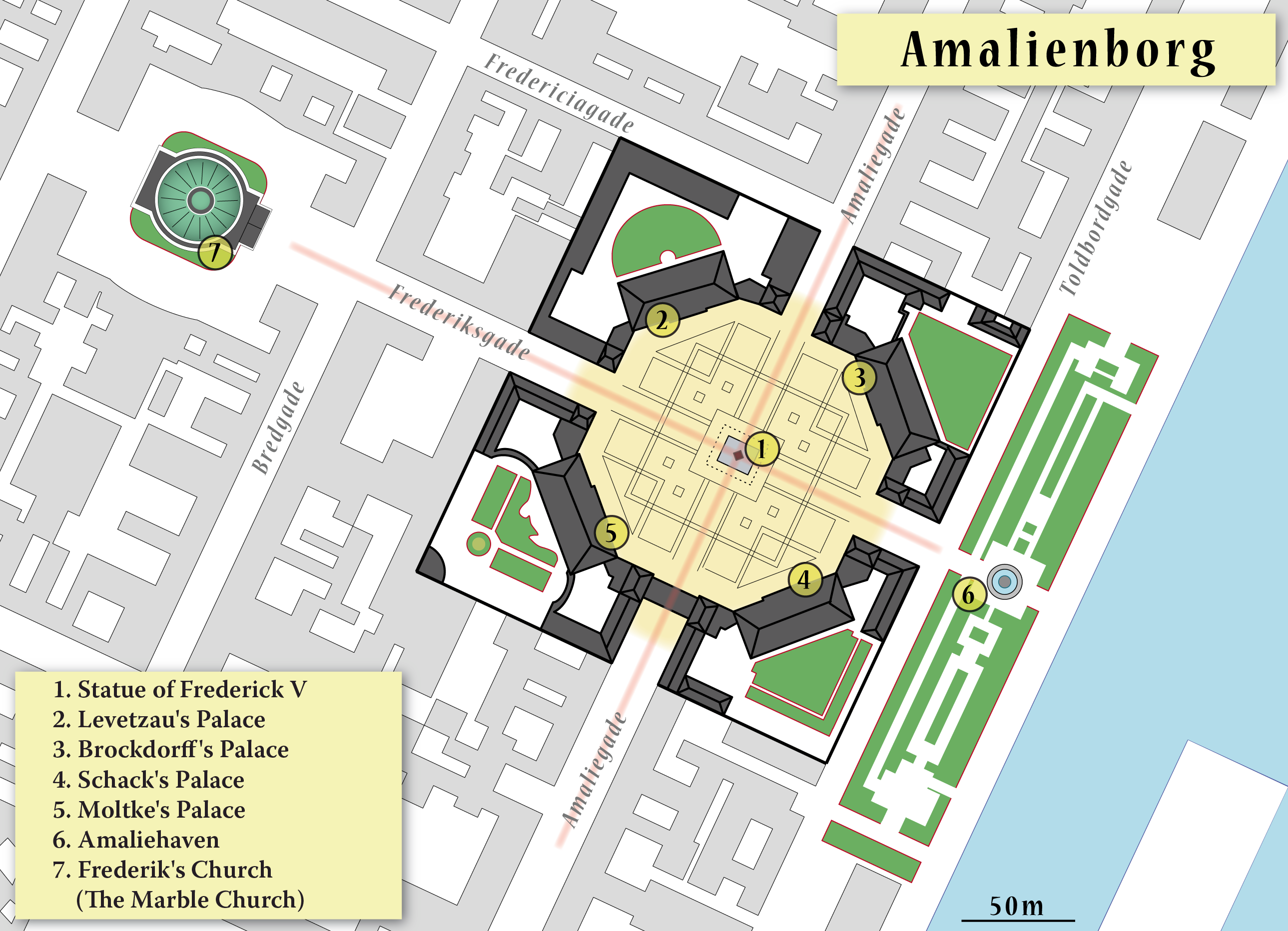
Map of Amalienborg (Frederik's Church is also shown)

According to Eigtved's master plans for Frederikstad and the Amalienborg Palaces, the four palaces surrounding the plaza were conceived of as town mansions for the families of chosen nobility. Their exteriors were identical, but interiors differed. The site on which the aristocrats could build was given to them free of charge, and they were further exempted from taxes and duties. The only conditions were that the palaces should comply exactly to the Frederikstad architectural specifications, and that they should be built within a specified timeframe.

Building of the palaces on the western side of the square started in 1750. When Eigtved died in 1754 the two western palaces had been completed. The work on the other palaces was continued by Eigtved's colleague and rival, Lauritz de Thurah strictly according to Eigtved's plans. The palaces were completed in 1760.

The four palaces are:

- Christian VII's Palace, originally known as Moltke's Palace
- Christian VIII's Palace, originally known as Levetzau's Palace
- Frederik VIII's Palace, originally known as Brockdorff's Palace
- Christian IX's Palace, originally known as Schack's Palace

Currently, only the palaces of Christian VII and Christian VIII are open to the public.

=== Christian VII's Palace ===
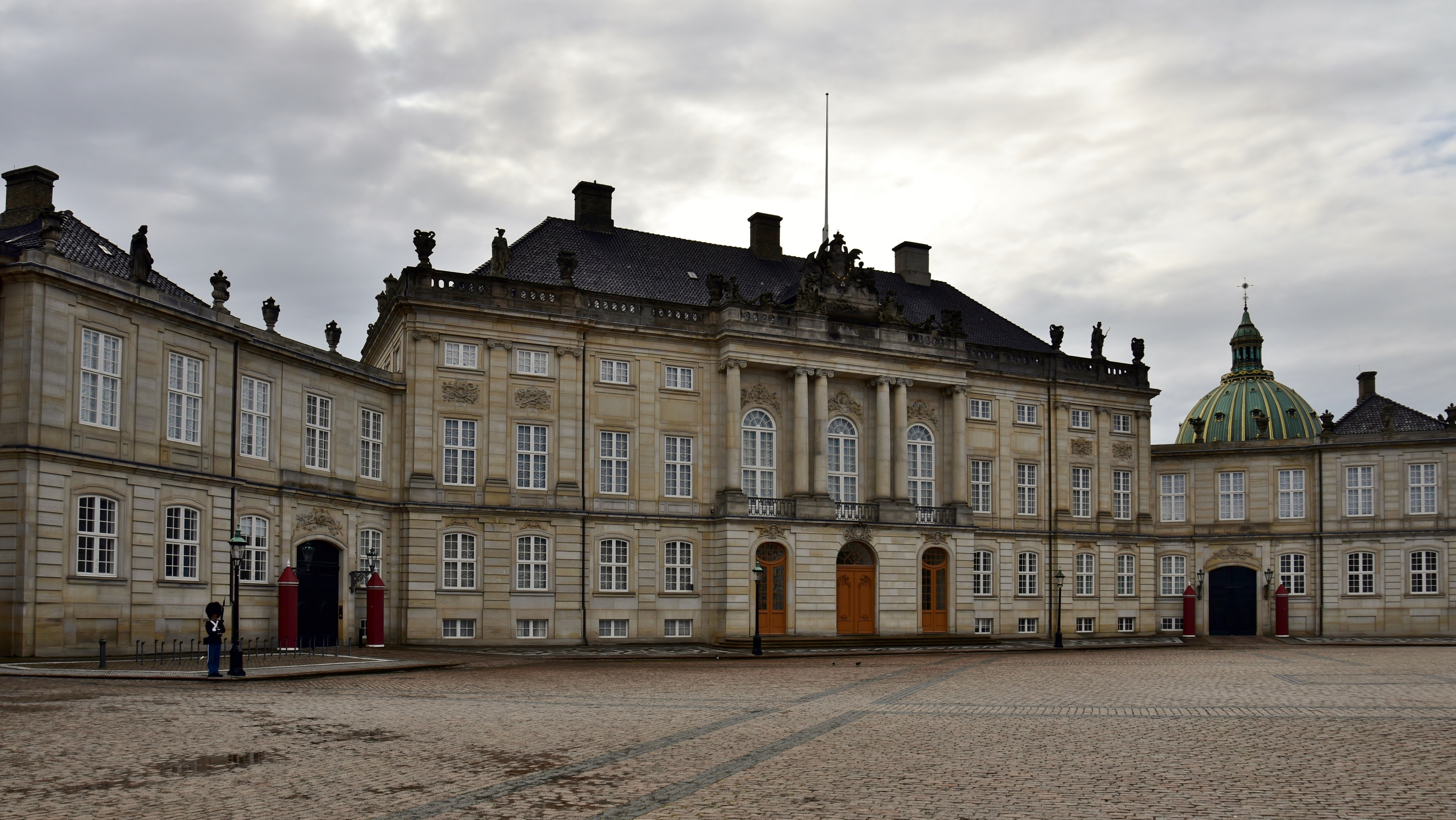
Christian VII's Palace (Moltke's Palace)

Christian VII's Palace is also known as Moltke's Palace, and was originally built for Lord High Steward Adam Gottlob Moltke. It is the southwestern palace, and has been since 1885 used to accommodate and entertain prominent guests, for receptions, and for ceremonial purposes.

Moltke's Palace was erected in 1750–54 by the best craftsmen and artists of their day under the supervision of Eigtved. It was the most expensive of the four palaces at the time it was built, and had the most extravagant interiors. Its Great Hall (Riddersalen) featured woodcarvings (boiserie) by Louis August le Clerc, paintings by François Boucher and stucco by Giovanni Battista Fossati, and is acknowledged widely as perhaps the finest Danish Rococo interior.

The mansion formally opened on 30 March 1754, the King's thirtieth birthday. Due to Eigtved's death a few months later, final work such as the Banqueting Hall, was completed by Nicolas-Henri Jardin.

Immediately after the Christiansborg Palace fire in February 1794 and two years after the death of the original owner, the royal family, headed by the King Christian VII, purchased the first of the four palaces to be sold to the royal family, and commissioned Caspar Frederik Harsdorff to turn it into a royal residence. They occupied the new residence December 1794.

After Christian VII's death in 1808, Frederick VI used the palace for his Royal Household. The Ministry of Foreign Affairs used parts of the palace from 1852 to 1885. For short periods of time in the intervening years the palace has housed various members of the royal family while restoration took place on their respective palaces. In 1971–1975 a small kindergarten was established at the palace, and later a schoolroom, for Crown Prince Frederik and Prince Joachim.

After 200 years the façade, decorated by German sculptor Johann Christoph Petzold, was severely damaged, causing parts of Amalienborg Place to be closed to prevent injury. In 1982, exterior and interior restoration began that completed in early 1996, Copenhagen's year as European Capital of Culture. In 1999, Europa Nostra, an international preservation organisation, acknowledged the restoration by presenting a medal.

The palace is occasionally open to the general public for tours.

=== Christian VIII's Palace ===
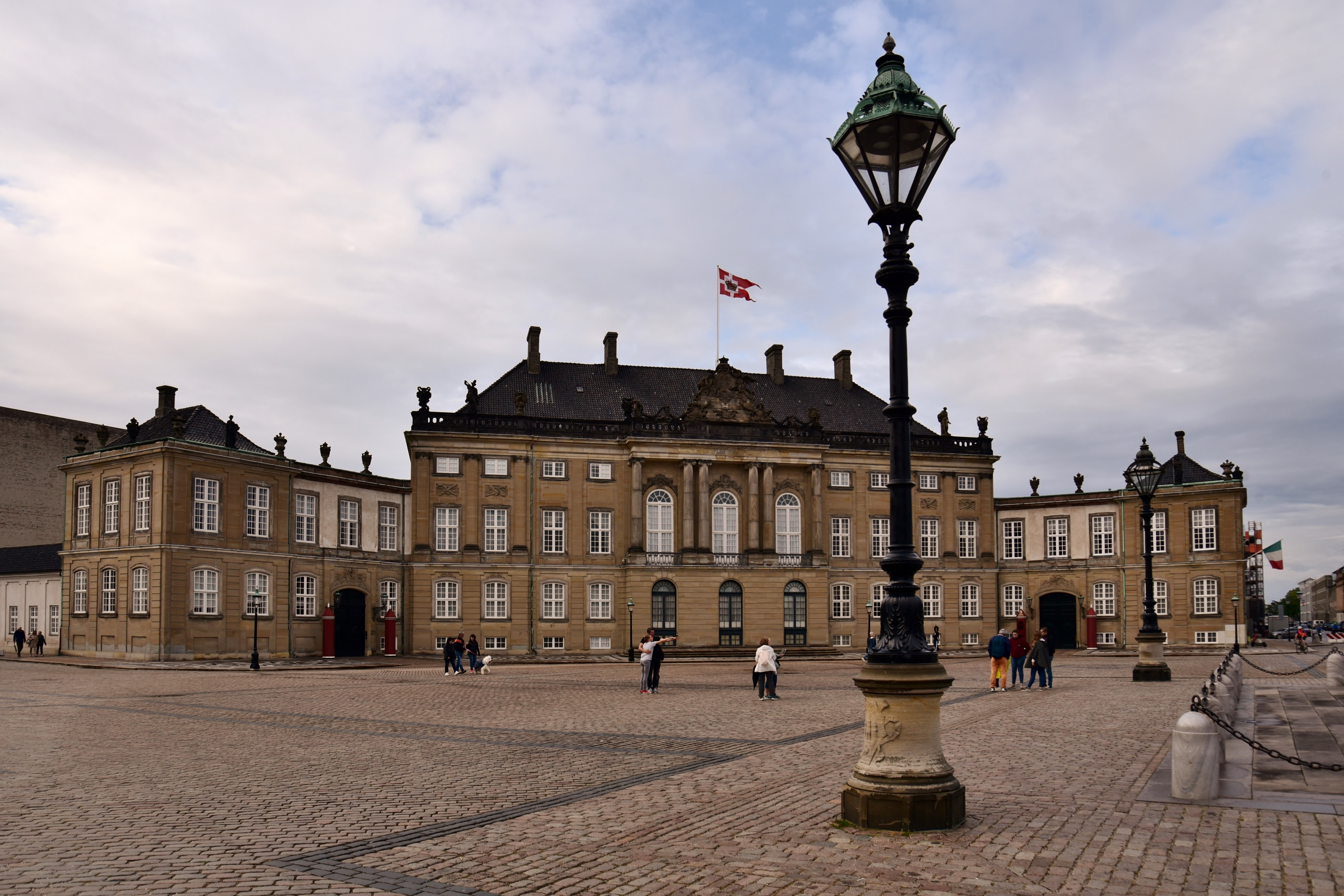
Christian VIII's Palace (Levetzau's Palace)

Christian VIII's Palace, also known as Levetzau's Palace, is the northwestern palace and was originally built for Privy Councillor Count Christian Frederik Levetzau in 1750–60. Queen Margrethe II's grandson Count Felix currently lives in an apartment in the palace. Prince Joachim and Princess Marie, who reside permanently in Washington DC, have also had an apartment made available to them in the palace when they perform engagements in Denmark.

After Eigtved's death in 1754, royal architect Lauritz de Thurah carried out supervision of the building's construction according to Eigtved's plans.

The palace was sold by the entailed estate of Restrup, which had been established in 1756 by Levertzau, the late owner. The family set one condition when they sold the building— that the Count's coat of arms should never be removed from the building. It can still be seen beside that of the monarch's.

The King's half-brother Frederik bought the palace in 1794, and painter and architect Nikolai Abildgaard modernized the interiors in the new French Empire style. The palace was named Christian VIII's Palace after his son, Christian Frederik, who grew up in the palace, took over the building in 1805 upon the death of his father, and would become king in 1839.

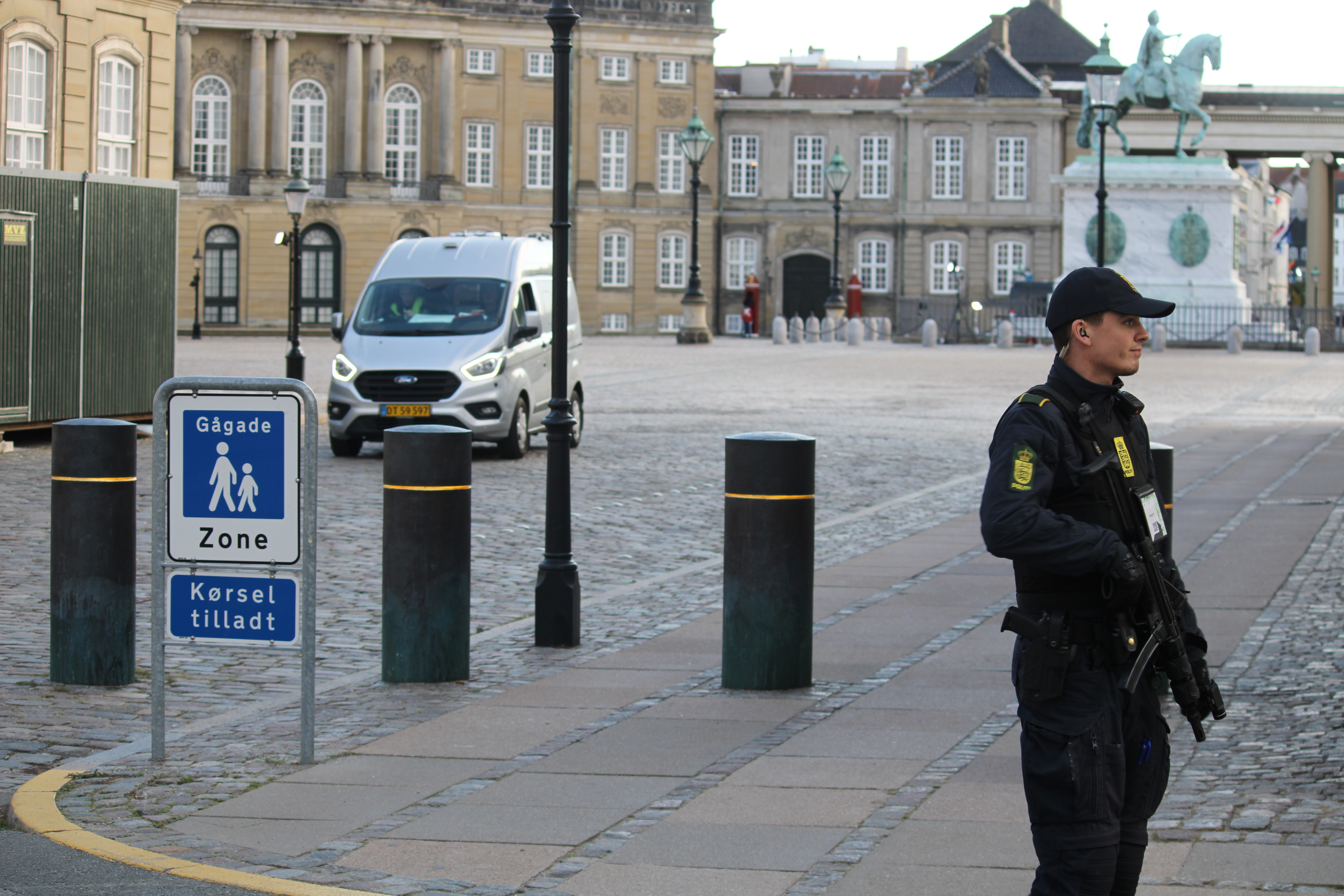
As seen from Amaliegade

Christian VIII died in 1848, and the Queen Dowager, Caroline Amalie, died in 1881. From 1885 the Ministry of Foreign Affairs used parts of the palace, but moved in 1898 when the palace became the residence of Crown Prince Christian (X) and Princess Alexandrine. After the death of Christian X the Palace was placed at the disposal of Prince Knud, the Heir Presumptive.

The palace was the home of Crown Prince Frederik until his marriage in 2004. From 2018 to 2019, Queen Margrethe II's eldest grandchild Prince Nikolai lived in an apartment in the palace.

Today, there is little left of the remaining rococo interior; much of the interior reflects the changing taste and style of its residents over the years.

In the 1980s the palace was restored as residence for the Crown Prince, storage facilities for the Queen's Reference Library and a museum for the Royal House of Glücksborg. The museum features private royal apartments from 1863 to 1947 including original fittings and furnishings. Tours are sometimes held of the rooms on the piano nobile.

=== Frederik VIII's Palace ===
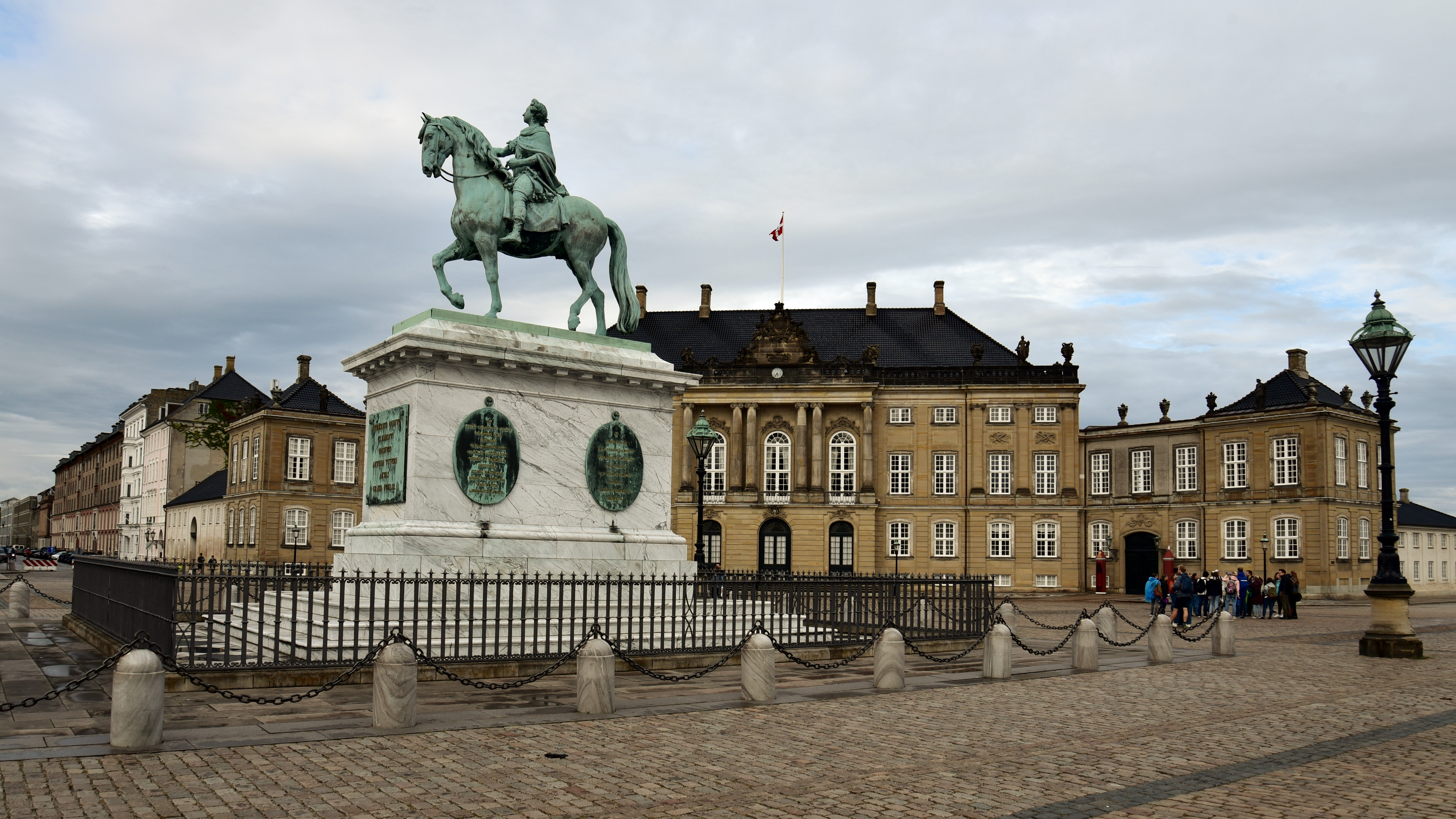
Frederik VIII's Palace in Amalienborg (Brockdorff's Palace)

Frederik VIII's Palace, also known as Brockdorff's Palace, is the northeastern palace. It has been the home of King Frederik X and Queen Mary since their marriage.

It was originally built for Count Joachim Brockdorff in the 1750s. Brockdorff died in 1763, and Lord High Steward Adam Gottlob Moltke acquired the palace. Moltke sold it two years later to King Frederick V.

From 1767 it housed the Royal Danish Military Academy, also known as the Army Cadet Academy (Landkadetakademi). In 1788 naval cadets replaced the army cadets until the academy moved to another location in 1827.

The following year the palace was prepared to house King Christian VIII's son, Frederik VII, who ascended the throne in 1848, and his bride, Princess Vilhelmine. Architect Jørgen Hansen Koch successfully and thoroughly refurbished the palace in French Empire style in 1827–28.

After the marriage was dissolved in 1837, various members of the royal family lived in the palace. In 1869, it became the home of Frederik VIII. In 1934, it became the home of King Frederik IX and Queen Ingrid. The latter lived there until her death in 2000. From 2006 to 2010 the palace underwent major renovation to accommodate the then Crown Prince couple.

=== Christian IX's Palace ===
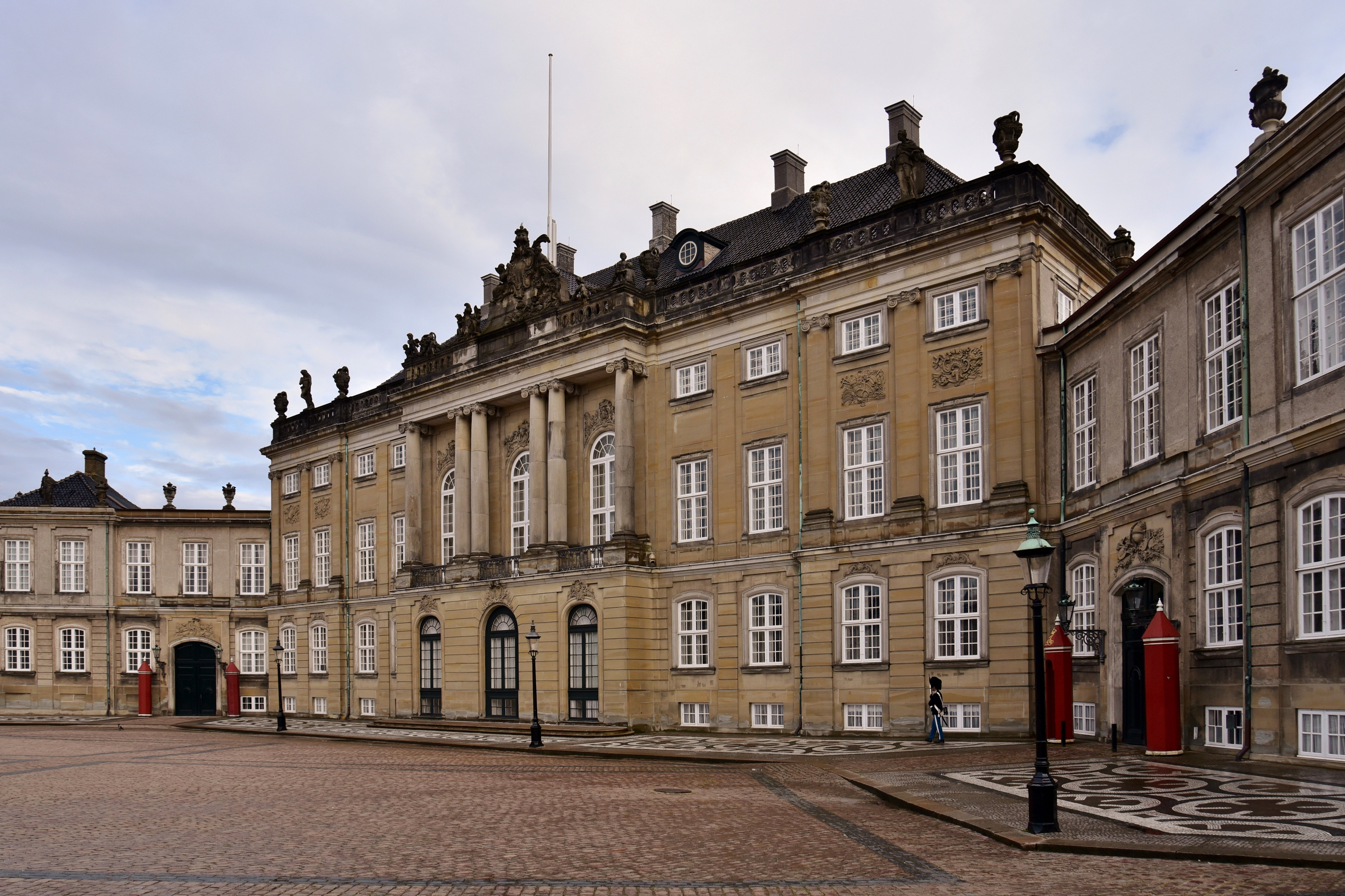
Christian IX's Palace (Schack's Palace)

Christian IX's Palace is the southeastern palace, and is also known as Schack's Palace. It has been the home of Queen Margrethe II since 1967.

Building work was commenced in 1750 by Eigtved, and was supervised first by architect Christian Josef Zuber and later by Philip de Lange.

It was originally commissioned by Privy Councillor Severin Løvenskjold, but in 1754 he had to give up due to economic difficulties. The project was taken over by Countess Anna Sophie Schack née Rantzau and her step-grandson Hans Schack, 4th Count of Schackenborg. A fire shortly after the change of ownership delayed completion by a couple of years.

On 7 January 1757 Hans Schack married Countess Ulrikke Auguste Vilhelmine Moltke, daughter of Adam Gottlob Moltke, and as his son-in-law had use of the best artists and craftsmen to complete the interiors.

In 1794, the palace was taken over from private residence by the Prince regent, then Crown Prince Frederick, and his wife, Crown Princess Marie. He died in 1839, and she in 1852. The palace was used after her death by, among others, the Supreme Court and the Ministry of Foreign Affairs.

It was later the home of Christian IX until his death in 1906. The home remained untouched afterwards until 1948. In 1967, the palace was restored for the then successor to the throne, Princess Margrethe and her husband Prince Henrik. She succeeded to the throne at the age of 31 as Margrethe II in 1972.

== Royal Guard ==
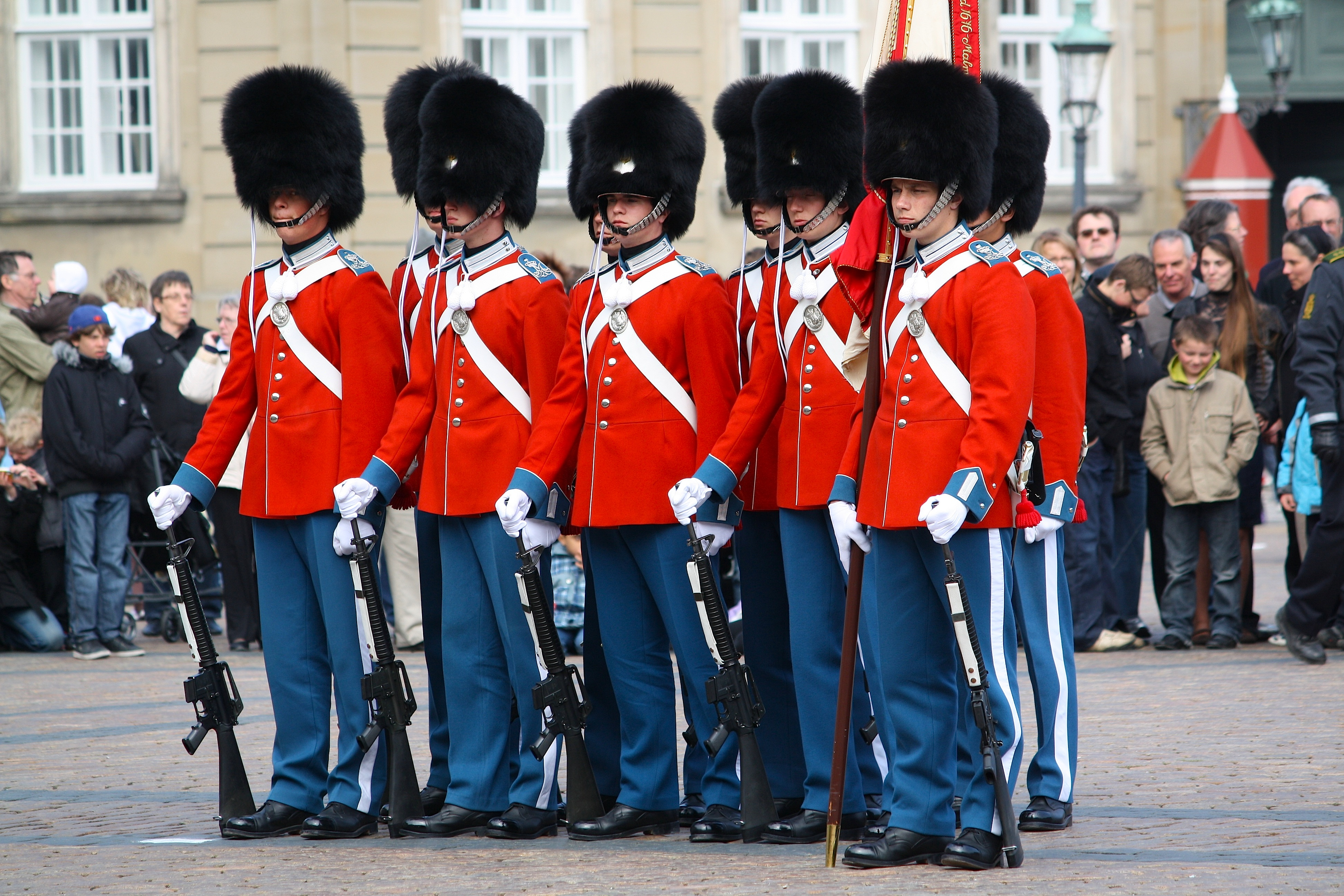
Royal Guard

Amalienborg is guarded day and night by Royal Life Guards (Den Kongelige Livgarde). Their full dress uniform is fairly similar to that of the Foot Guards regiments of the British Army: a scarlet tunic, blue trousers, and a navy bearskin cap. The guard march from Rosenborg Castle at 11.30 am daily through the streets of Copenhagen and execute the changing of the guard in front of Amalienborg at noon. In addition, post replacement is conducted every two hours.

When the monarch is in residence, the King's Guard (Kongevagt) also march alongside the changing of the guard at noon, accompanied by a band that plays traditional military marches. The Guard Lieutenant (Løjtnantsvagt) is always alerted when King Frederik or another member of the royal family is in residence. There are three types of watches: King's Watch, Lieutenant Watch and Palace Watch. A King's Watch is when His Majesty the King takes up residence in Christian IX's Palace. A Lieutenant Watch is when Prince Joachim, or Princess Benedikte, takes the place as regent, when the monarch is unable to. A Palace Watch is when no member of the royal family is in the palace, and it is the smallest one.

== Equestrian statue ==
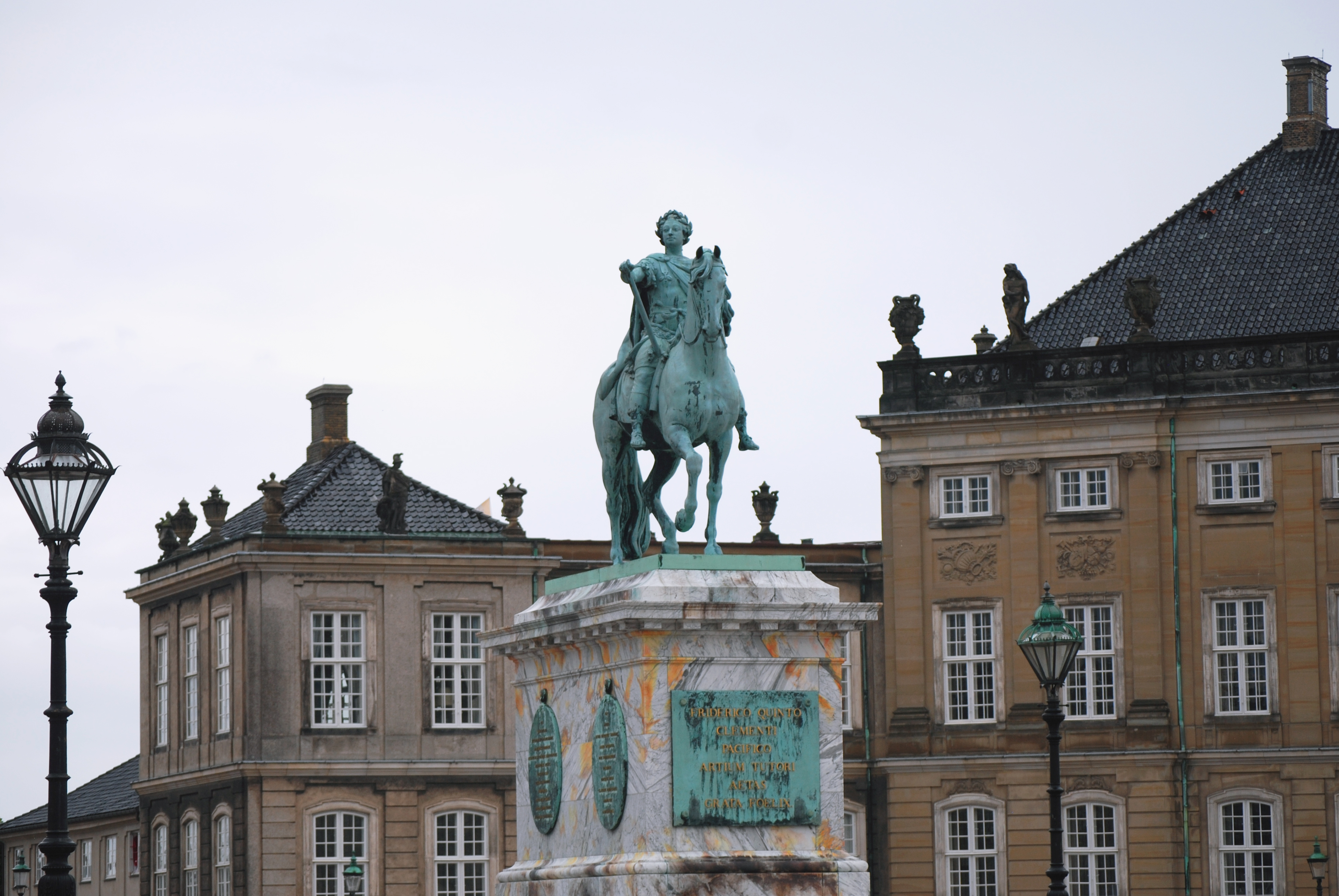
Frederik V on Horseback by Jacques Saly. It is at the centre of the Amalienborg Palace Square.

The equestrian statue of King Frederik V was commissioned by Moltke, as Director for the Danish Asiatic Company, and it was made by French sculptor Jacques Saly. Work began in 1753, and the foundation stone was laid in place in 1760 at the 100-year celebration of political absolutism in Denmark. The statue was finally unveiled in 1771, five years after King Frederik V's death in 1766.

== Amaliehaven ==
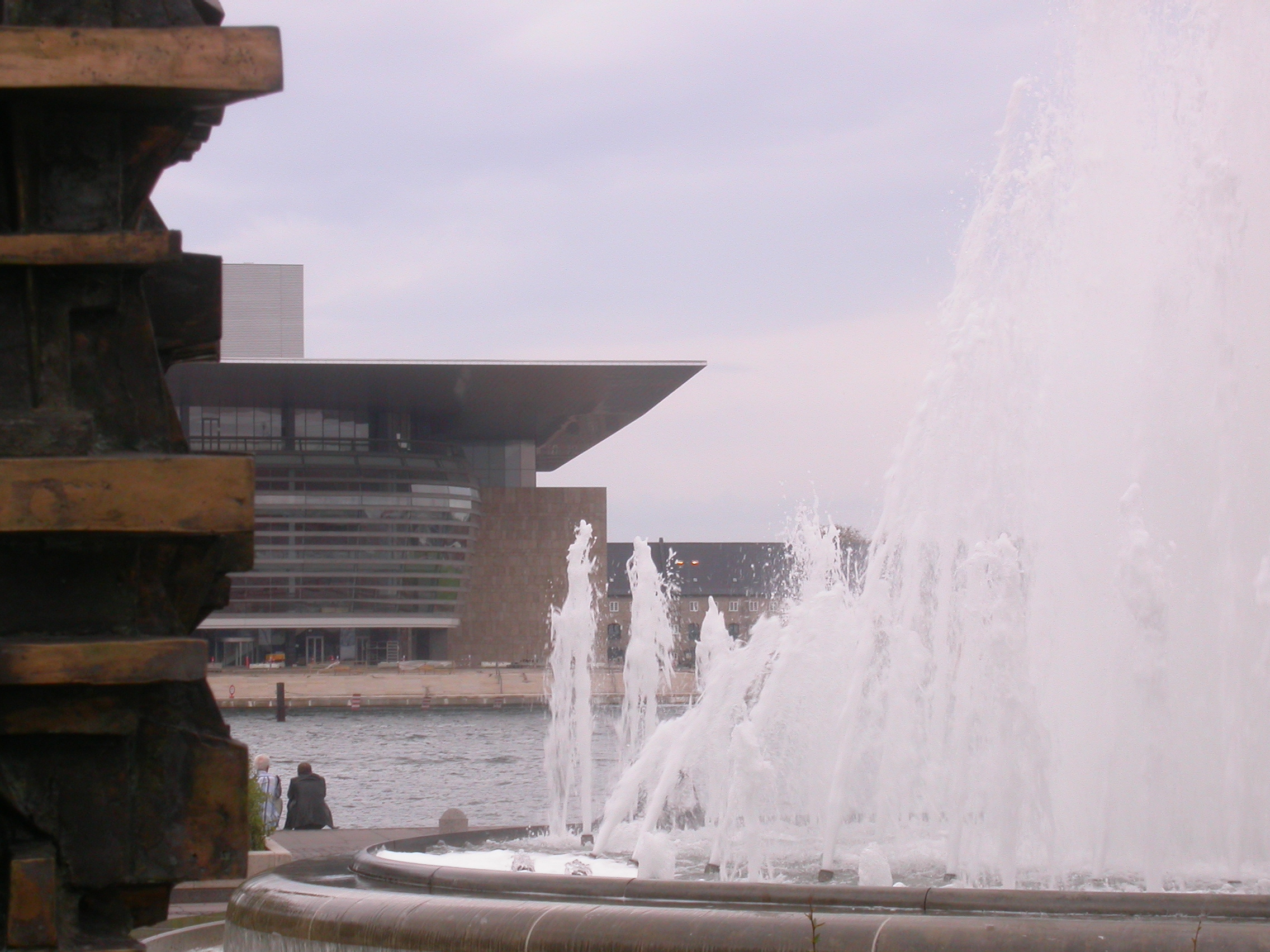
The fountain in Amaliehaven, with Copenhagen Opera House in the background, across the water

The Amalie Garden (Danish: Amaliehaven) is located between the waterfront and Amalienborg Slotsplads. Established in 1983, it was a gift from the A.P. Møller and Chastine McKinney Møller Foundation to the citizens of Copenhagen. The two-level garden was designed by Belgian architect Jean Delogne. It features marble sculptures and a central fountain designed by Italian Arnaldo Pomodoro. It is owned jointly by the Danish state and the municipality of Copenhagen, and maintained by the Palaces and Properties Agency.

== Axis alignments ==
The short axis on which Amalienborg lies, Frederiksgade (English: "Frederik's Street"), has been much discussed due to construction the building of the Copenhagen Opera House in 2001–04.

Aligned on the short axis are:

- Frederik's Church (Danish: Frederikskirke), commonly known as The Marble Church (Danish: Marmorkirken).
- Amalienborg
- Copenhagen Opera House

The long axis on which Amalienborg lies is Amaliegade (English: "Amalie Street").

== See also ==
- List of Baroque residences
- List of castles and palaces in Denmark
- Tourism in Denmark
