= Brockdorff's Palace =

Palace of the Danish Royal Family in Copenhagen

Coordinates: 55°41′03″N 12°35′40″E

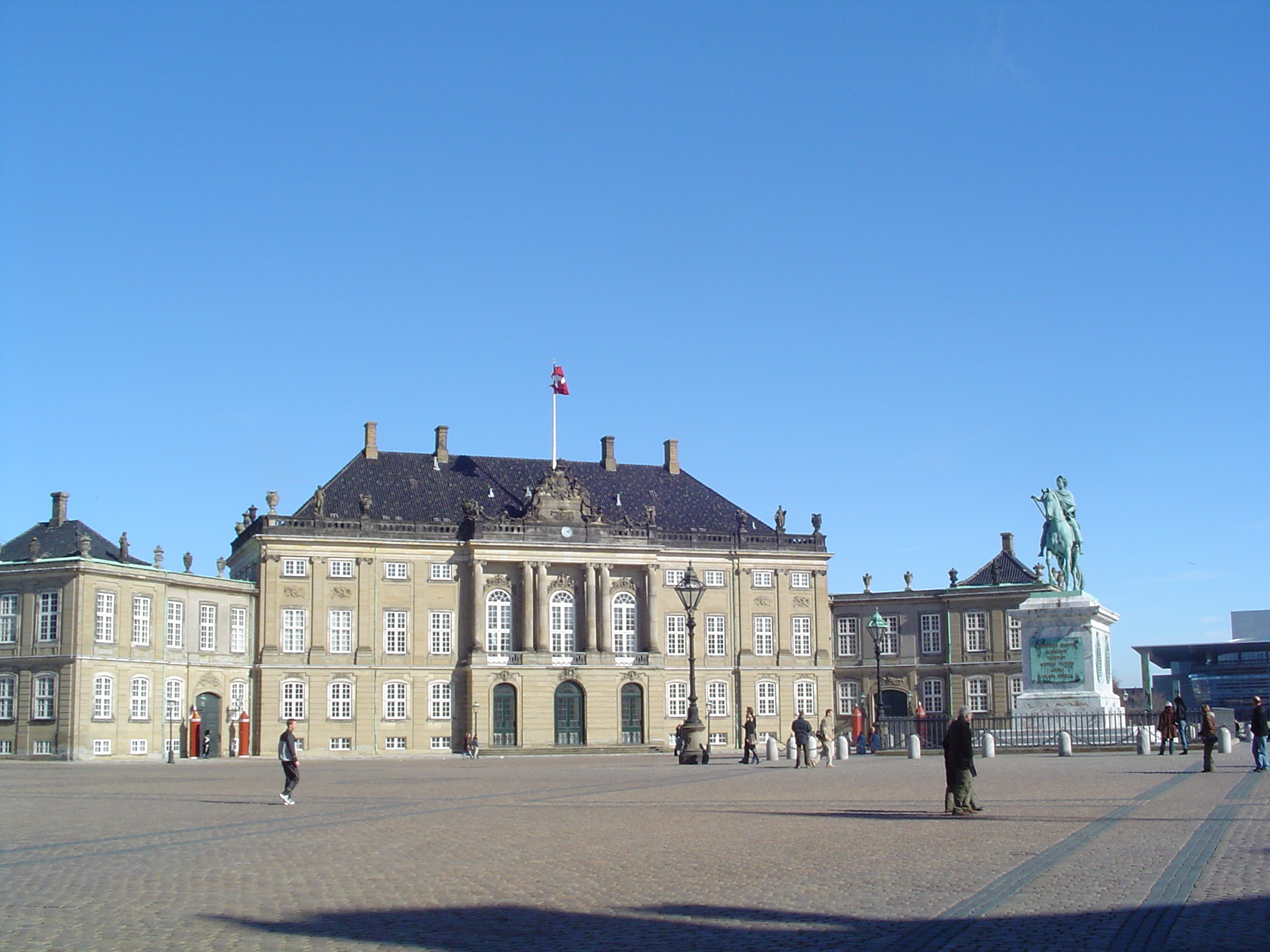
Frederik VIII's Palace in Amalienborg (Brockdorff's Palace)

King Frederik VIII's Palace (Brockdorff's Palace) is one of the four palaces of Amalienborg in Copenhagen, Denmark.

== History ==
It was built 1750-1760 by Baron Joachim von Brockdorff. Since 1765 Brockdorff palace has been owned by the crown, first used as naval academy and since 1828 as residence of various part of the royal family, among those King Frederik VIII. Therefore, the palace is also known as King Frederik VIII's Palace.

It is one of the two palaces facing the Amaliehaven waterfront, the other being the residence of the Queen Margrethe II, who abdicated in January 2024.

From 1947 until 1972 it was the official residence of King Frederik IX and Queen Ingrid. The then Crown Prince moved into the Palace 1934, and it was in use by the Queen Ingrid until her death in 2000.

With restoration works being finished in 2009, it is currently the home of The King and Queen of Denmark and their children.

== Sources ==
- the Palaces and Properties Agency
