= Danish Crown Regalia =

Symbols of the Danish monarchy

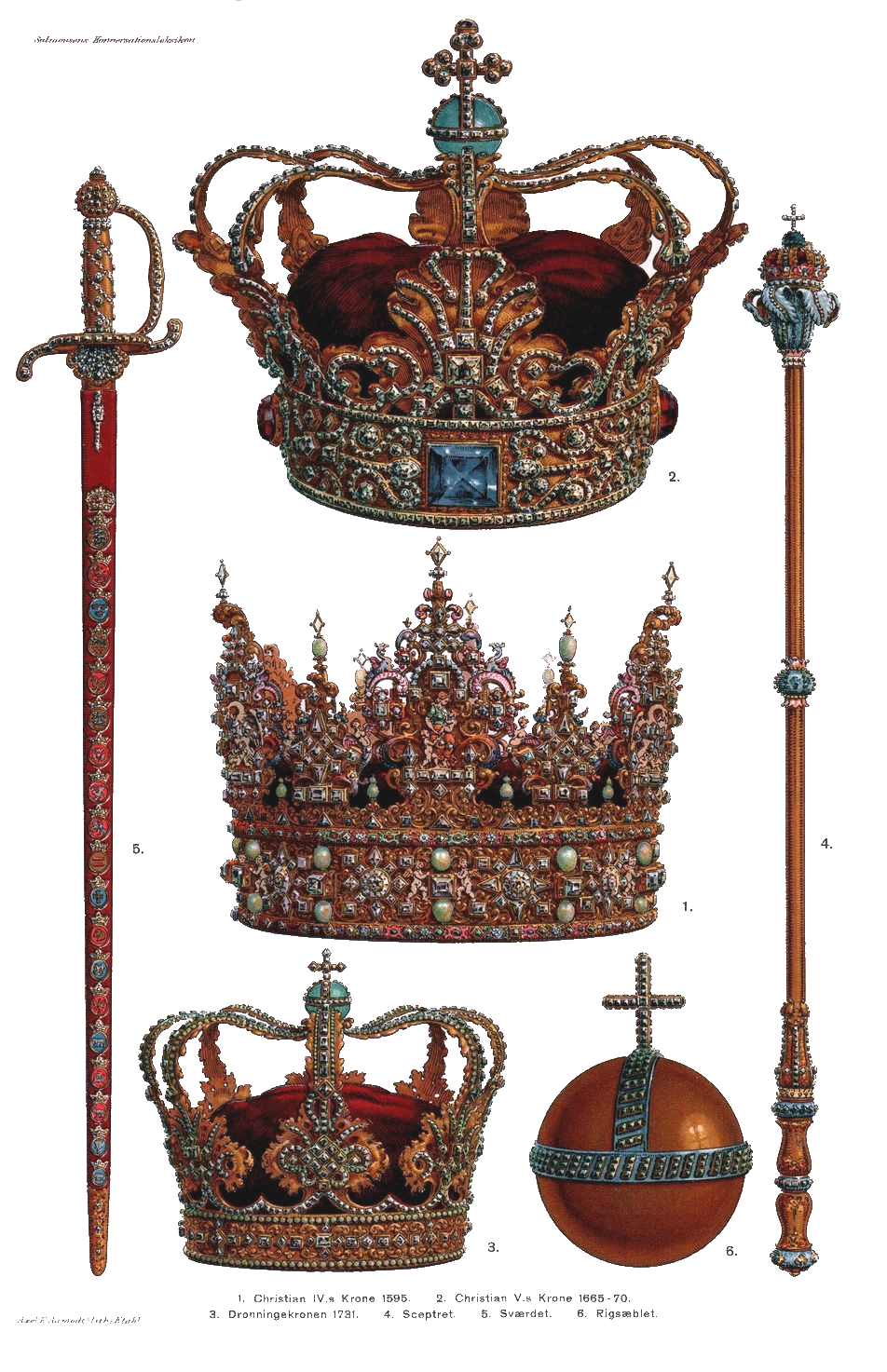
Danish Crown Regalia: 1. Crown of Christian IV (1595); 2. Crown of Christian V (1665–1670); 3. Queen's crown (1731); 4. Sceptre; 5. Sword of state; 6. globus cruciger.

The Danish Crown Regalia (Danish: Danmarks kronregalier) are the symbols of the Danish monarchy. They consist of three crowns, a sceptre, symbolising supreme authority; a globus cruciger, an orb surmounted by a cross and symbolising the earthly realm; the sword of state; and an ampulla, used in the anointing of monarchs.

The Danish royal regalia are kept in the treasury at Rosenborg Castle. The oldest item is Christian III's sword of state, dating from 1551. The treasury also contains Christian IV's diamond, pearl- and gold-embroidered saddles, objects carved from ivory and rock crystal, lapidary works of precious stones, and brooches in the form of fantastic animals.

During the time of the elective monarchs, the clergy and nobility placed the crown on a monarch's head at the coronation ceremony. After the introduction of absolutism in 1660, the crowning of the monarch was replaced by anointment, for which the monarch arrived in church wearing the crown and was consecrated to their calling by being anointed with oil. For the anointing of Christian V, a new crown was made along with the Throne Chair of Denmark of narwhal teeth (supposedly the mythical unicorn's horn) and three silver lions, the latter created by Ferdinand Küblich (1664–1687). This was inspired by the biblical description of King Solomon's throne, which was said to be composed of unicorn's horn and gold and guarded by twelve golden lions.

With the 1849 Constitution, anointing was discontinued and since then the regalia have only been used on the occasion of a deceased monarch's lying in state, known in Danish as castrum doloris ("camp of woe"), where the crown is placed on the coffin, the other regalia laid at the casket's foot, and the casket surrounded by the three lions. The lions were formerly also displayed in Parliament during the annual opening session, but this tradition was discontinued almost 100 years ago. They were also displayed before the throne in the throne room of Christiansborg Palace when Danish monarchs granted audiences on particularly formal occasions.

The crown jewels refer to four sets (parures) of jewellery owned by the state for an incumbent queen and, until the point of her abdication, worn by the Margrethe II as Queen of Denmark.

The royal regalia, which symbolised the monarch's authority to rule, includes the crown of Christian IV, an example of Renaissance guild work, the better known crown of Christian V and a smaller crown for the king's consort. The Royal Collection has other important items and jewels, as well as precious prayer-books, and items belonging to the Order of the Elephant and the Order of the Dannebrog (such as the large diamond and pearl star of the Order of the Elephant worn on the coronation mantle).

== The old regalia ==
The term old regalia is used to describe the crown regalia used prior to the introduction of absolute monarchy in 1660.

=== The crown of Christian IV ===
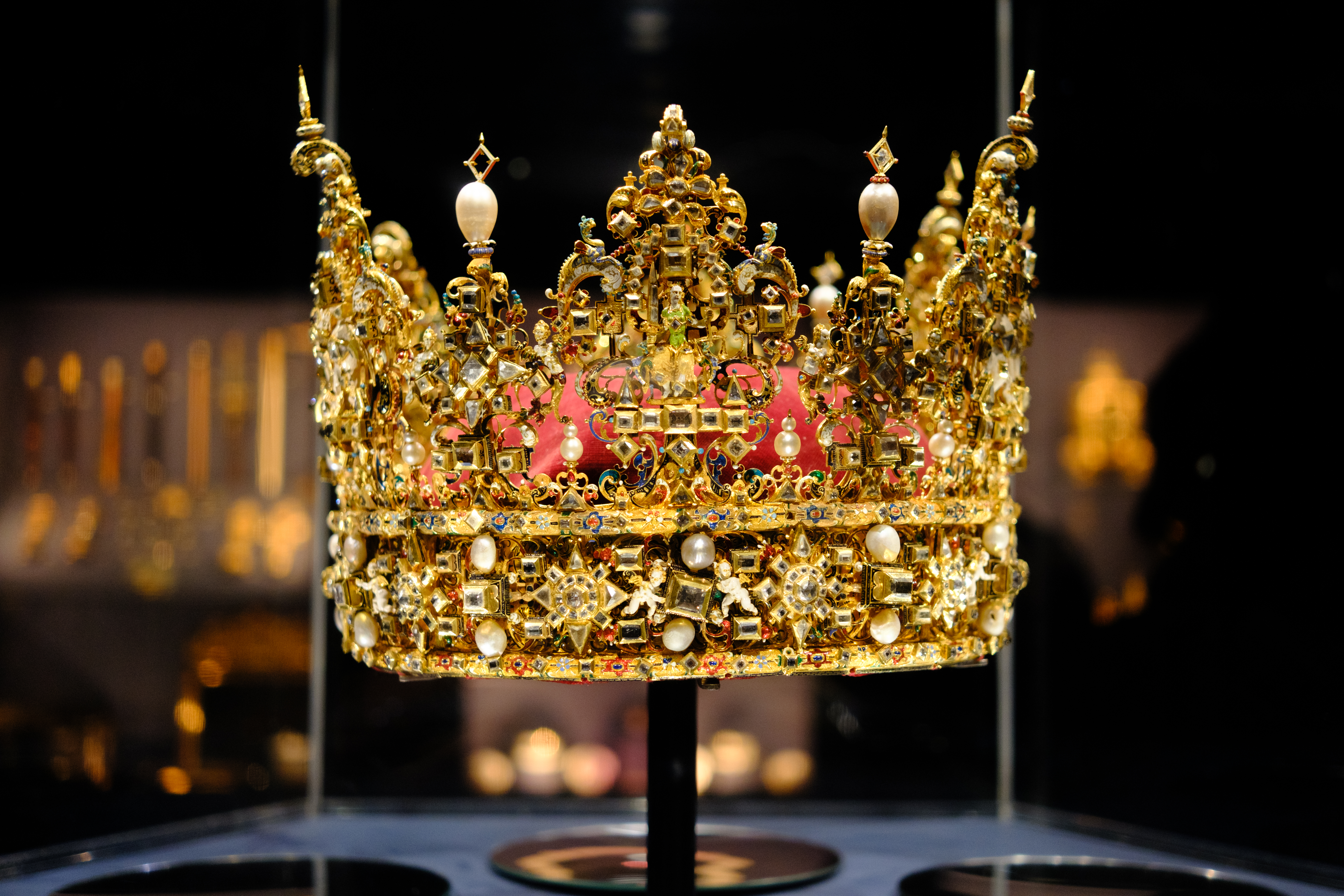
The Crown of King Christian IV

The crown was made in Odense by goldsmith Dirich Fyring (1580–1603), with assistance from the Nuremberg goldsmith Corvinianus Saur, between 1595 and 1596 for the coronation of Christian IV. It is made of gold and decorated with enamel, table-cut gemstones, and pearls, and weighs 2,895 g.

The circlet is ornamented with six sets of table cut diamonds between two large round pearls with enameled putti on either side. Between each of these sets are star-like ornaments of triangular and square table cut diamonds. On the upper rim of the circlet are six large and six small arabesque-like points. At the center of each of the larger points is an enameled allegorical figure of one of the king's ruling functions and virtues. The three points above the king's forehead and behind each of his ears bears a "pelican in her piety." The point on the right of the king's forehead bears a representation of Fortitude riding a lion, while that on the left bears the image of Justice as a woman holding a sword and a pair of scales. The point above the back of the king's neck bears the traditional image of Charity as a mother suckling her child. On the inside these points are decorated with the coats of arms of various regions of the realm. The six smaller points each bears a star-like design in triangular and square table diamonds with a large pear shaped pearl at its top.

Originally an open crown, in 1648 it was closed with arches and a monde and cross, but Christian V later removed these again, using the diamonds and gold from them in the making of his own crown. It was used for the last time at the 1648 coronation of Frederick III.

=== Christian III's sword of state ===
The sword of state of Christian III was made in 1551 by Johann Siebe. It is made of gilded silver and decorated with enamel and table cut gemstones. Prior to the introduction of absolute monarchy, the sword was the first of the regalia presented to the king.

=== Christian IV's accolade sword ===
The sword was used for accolades and has a blue enamel grip decorated with diamonds.

== The new regalia ==
=== The crown of Christian V ===
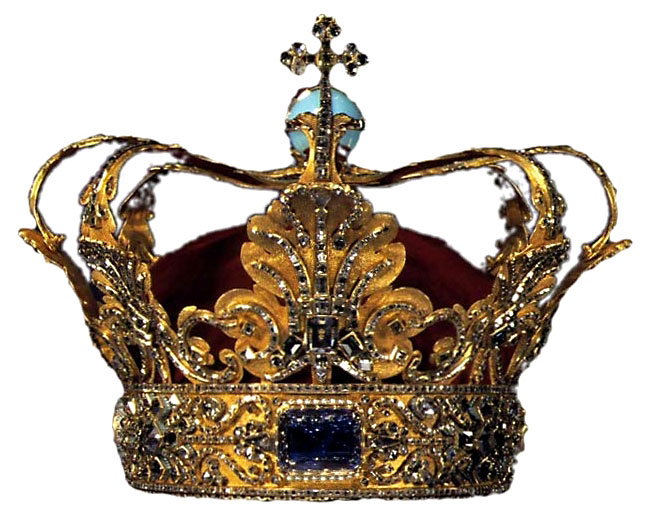
The crown of Christian V

This crown is the official crown that was used for the anointments of Danish absolute monarchs until the end of absolutism in 1849. The first Danish absolute monarch Frederick III wanted his son and heir-apparent, the later Christian V, to be in possession of the visible symbols of power at the moment he himself died and his son inherited the title. Therefore, he secretly commissioned several crown regalia, including a crown, to surround the anointing of the absolute monarchs with as much glory as possible.

The crown was first used for the coronation of Christian V and the last time for the coronation of Christian VIII in 1840. Today the crown is used as a symbol of the monarchy and the state. Its only ceremonial use is when it is placed on the Castrum doloris of a deceased monarch.

The crown is the visible sign of royal power and was made by the royal goldsmith Paul Kurtz in Copenhagen in the years 1670–1671. As the crown of the first absolute monarch it was made as a closed crown to look different than the open crowns of the elected kings, possibly inspired by the imperial crown of Charlemagne.

The circlet of the crown is divided in four by two large sapphires, a flat one that can be traced back to Frederick I at the forehead of the wearer (presumably a gift to his father, Christian I, from Galeazzo Maria Sforza, the Duke of Milan in 1474) and a thicker one at the back of the head and by a spinel at one side and a garnet at the other. The four curved segments of the circlet between these stones is decorated with volutes made of table cut diamonds.

On the upper edge of the circlet are eight acanthus leaves, four larger and four smaller ones. These acanthus leaves are decorated with diamond-studded ribs. The front acanthus leaf is decorated with a large table cut diamond with Christian V's royal cypher visible behind it. Attached to the backs of each of these acanthus leaves by screws are narrow diamond-studded half arches that meet at the top of the crown to support a sky blue-enameled sphere (monde) decorated with diamonds and with a diamond-studded cross on top. On the top of this cross is a cabochon ruby. The crown weighs 2080 g.

=== The Queen's Crown ===
The Queen's Crown
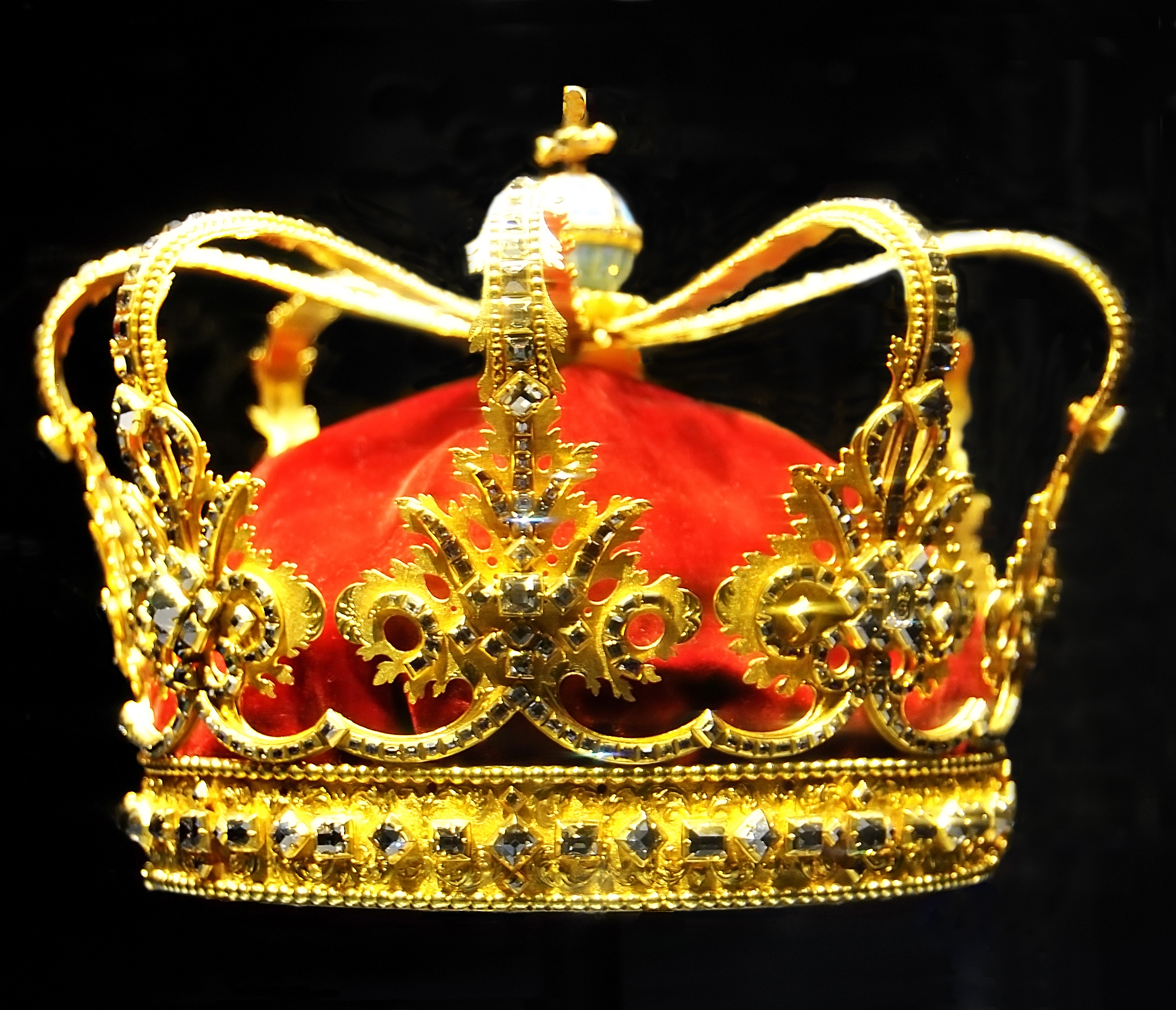
- The Queen of Denmark's Crown

Details
- Country: Denmark
- Made: 1731
- Arches: 8
- Material: Gold
- Cap: Red
- Notable stones: Diamonds

The queen consort Charlotte Amalie of Hesse-Kassel was not crowned and did not wear a crown because she belonged to the Reformed church and was thus not a member of the Church of Denmark or because it was thought unnecessary to crown the queen since she had the right to wear any regalia through her marriage with the king.

However all the following queens consort of the absolute monarchs were crowned. Louise of Mecklenburg-Güstrow, the consort of king Frederick IV, was crowned with a queen's crown made for her, which was also used by Frederick IV to crown her successor Anna Sophie Reventlow. However, Sophia Magdalen of Brandenburg-Kulmbach, the consort of king Christian VI, did not want to use the crown worn by her predecessor and had a new crown made by royal jeweler Frederik Fabritius (1683–1755) in 1731. This crown is made like that of Christian V but only taller and more slender. It is decorated with table cut diamonds that are assumed to come from the 1648 crown of Queen Sophie Amalie.

=== The Sceptre ===
The sceptre was made by an unknown Copenhagen goldsmith for the coronation of Frederick III in 1648. It is made of gold and ends in an elongated enameled knob at the bottom decorated with diamond-studded ribs and an enameled lily at the top with a royal crown above it.

=== Globus cruciger ===
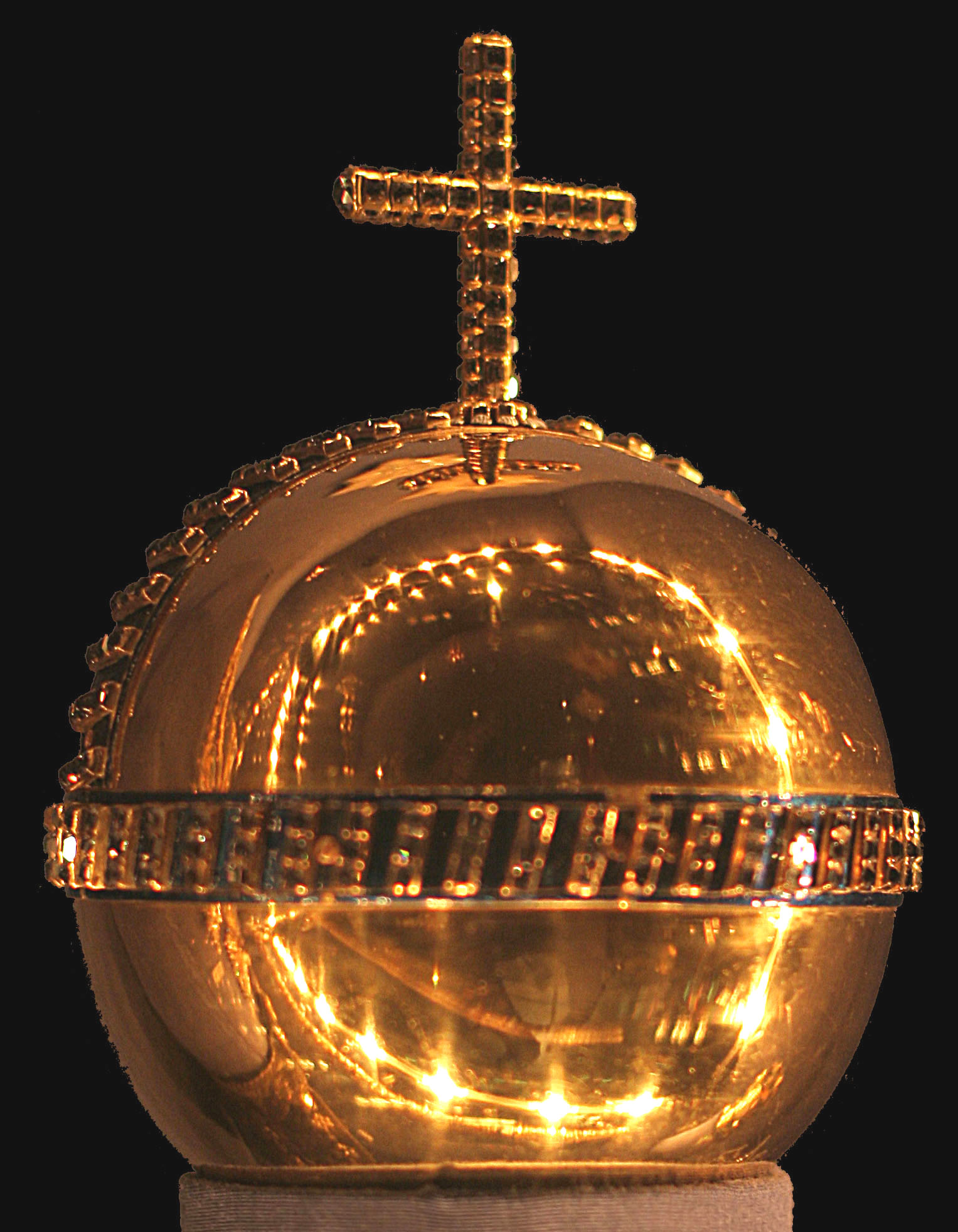
Danish Globus Cruciger

The globus cruciger is a golden globe decorated with a band of enamel and diamonds. On top of this is a half-circle of enamel and diamonds. It is topped by a diamond-studded cross. The cross represents Christ's dominion over the orb of the world. It was made in Hamburg for the coronation of Frederick III in 1648.

=== Sword of state ===
The sword of state symbolizes the protecting, punishing and judging authority of the king. The sword was originally a wedding present from Christian IV to the 1643 wedding of Frederick III. It was used for the anointing of all absolute monarchs and probably also for the coronation of Frederick III.

Its cross-guard and grip is decorated with gemstones. The scabbard has a diamond-studded Chape, is covered in red velvet and is decorated with the coats of arms of different parts of the realm. Above each coat of arms is a small diamond-studded crown.

=== Ampulla ===
The ampulla, used to contain the anointing oil, is a gold cylinder and its lid enameled with a variety of flowers and studded with table cut diamonds made by an unknown Copenhagen goldsmith for the coronation of Frederick III in 1648.

== See also ==
- Coronation Carpet
- Crown jewels
- Globus cruciger
