= Absalon's Drinking Horn =

14th-century drinking horn

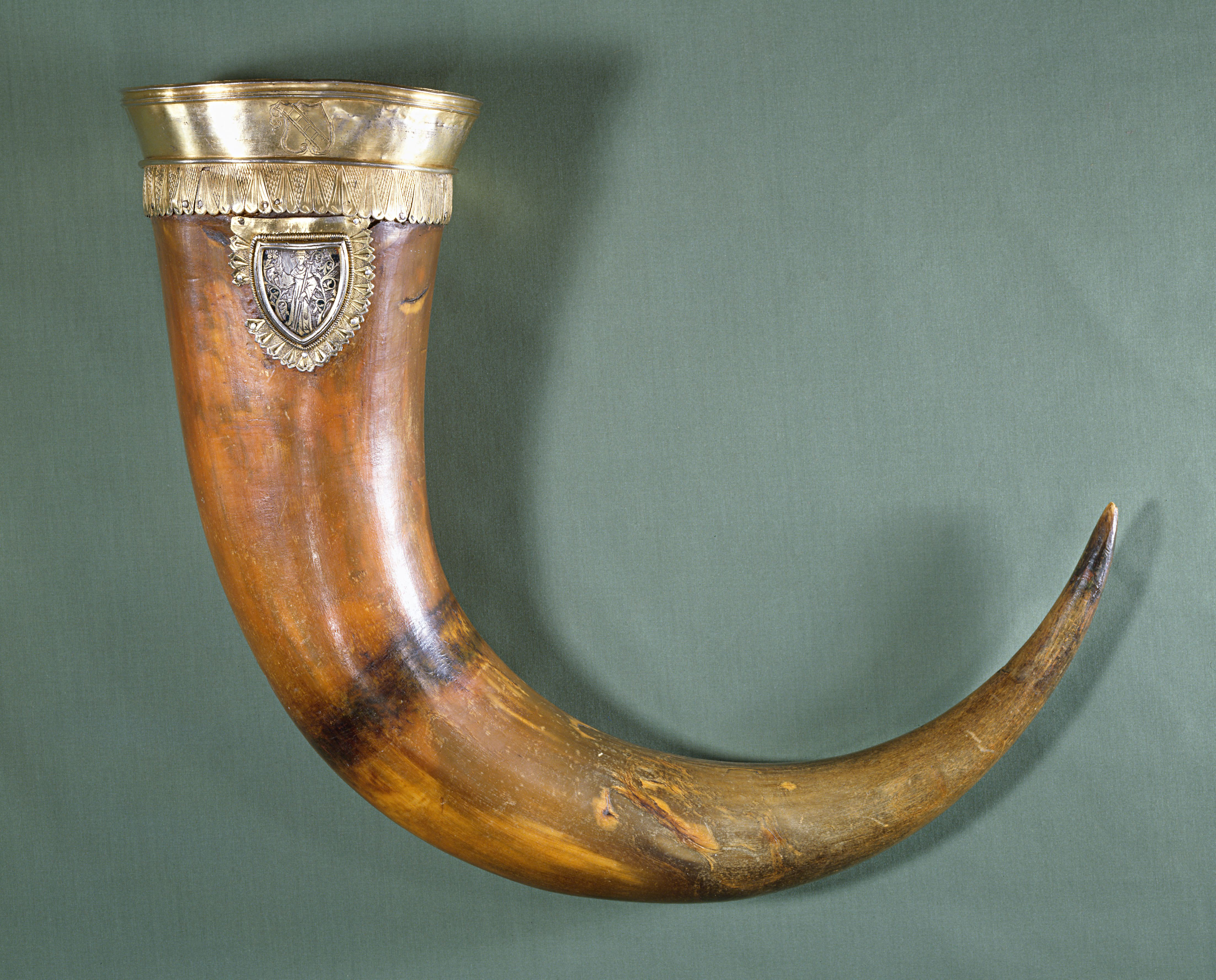
- Material: Animal horn, silver
- Created: 14th century
- Present location: National Museum of Denmark

Avsalon's Drinking Horn, named for Bishop Absalon because of an incorrect tradition that he was its first owner, is a 72 cm long 14th-century drinking horn, with silver mountings, two of which were added in the 15th and early 16th centuries, now in the collection of the National Museum of Denmark.

== History ==
The drinking horn dates from the 14th century and comes from the Cistercian Sorø Abbey. The incorrect tradition that it has belonged to Bishop Absalon may come from Henrik Tornekrans, its last Catholic abbot. It is first mentioned in the records of the Royal Danish Treasury in 1696. In 1845, it was transferred to the new National Museum of Denmark.

== Description ==
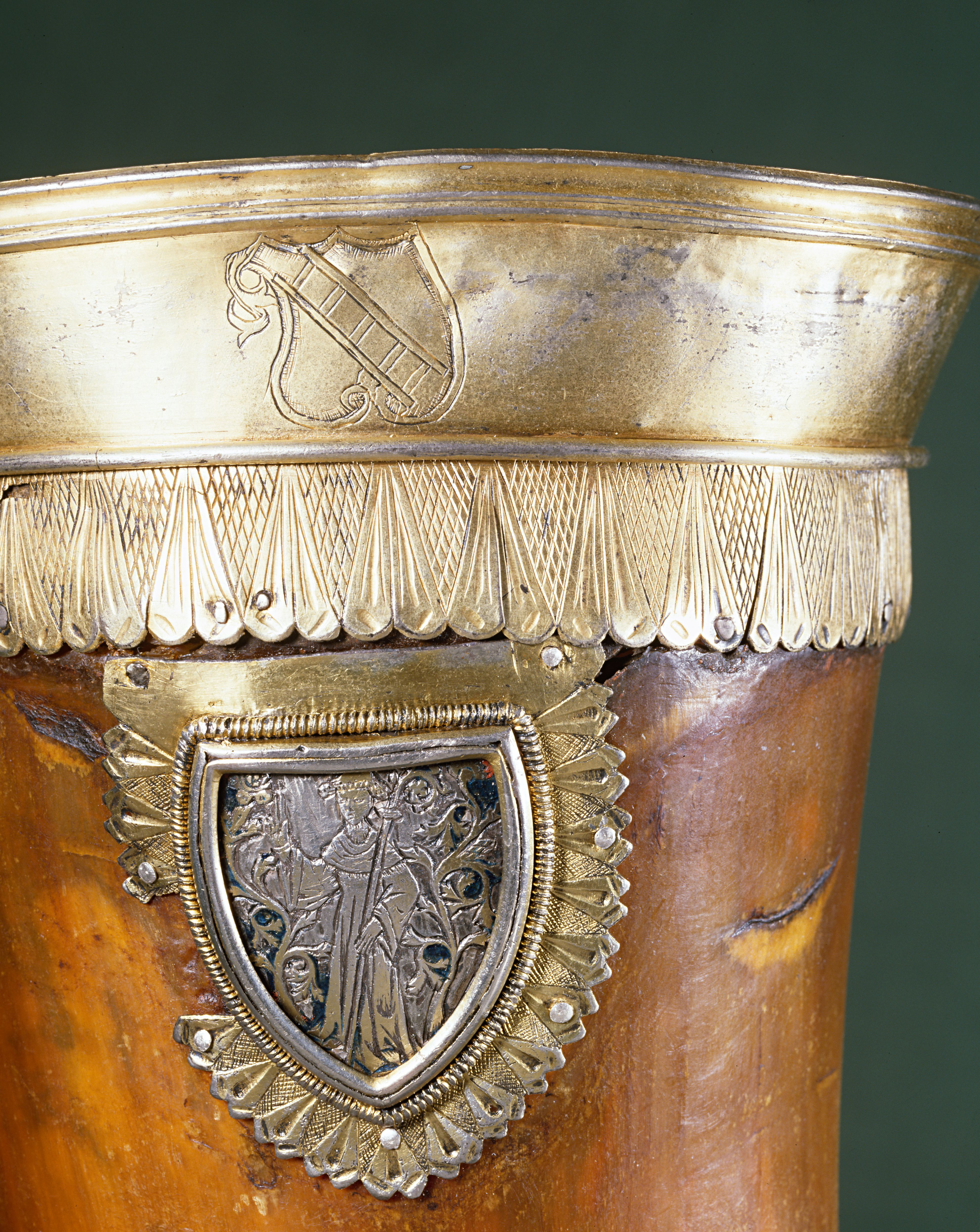
Detail

The horn is from European bison and its length measures 72.2 cm with a diameter is 15.5 cm. The silver mount of the rim measures 5 cm and is without ornamentation. Below it is an engraved frieze from the beginning of the 16th century with the coat of arms of the Tornekrans. Below the trim mount is also an escutcheon coat of arms from around 1400, depicting an abbot in a stylized garden. There are traces of a now-lost silver mount on the tip of the horn. On a drawing from 1696 of "Absalons belongings" (Sorø), it can be seen with the tip fixture still there.

== See also ==
- Oldenburg Horn
