= Oldenburg Horn =

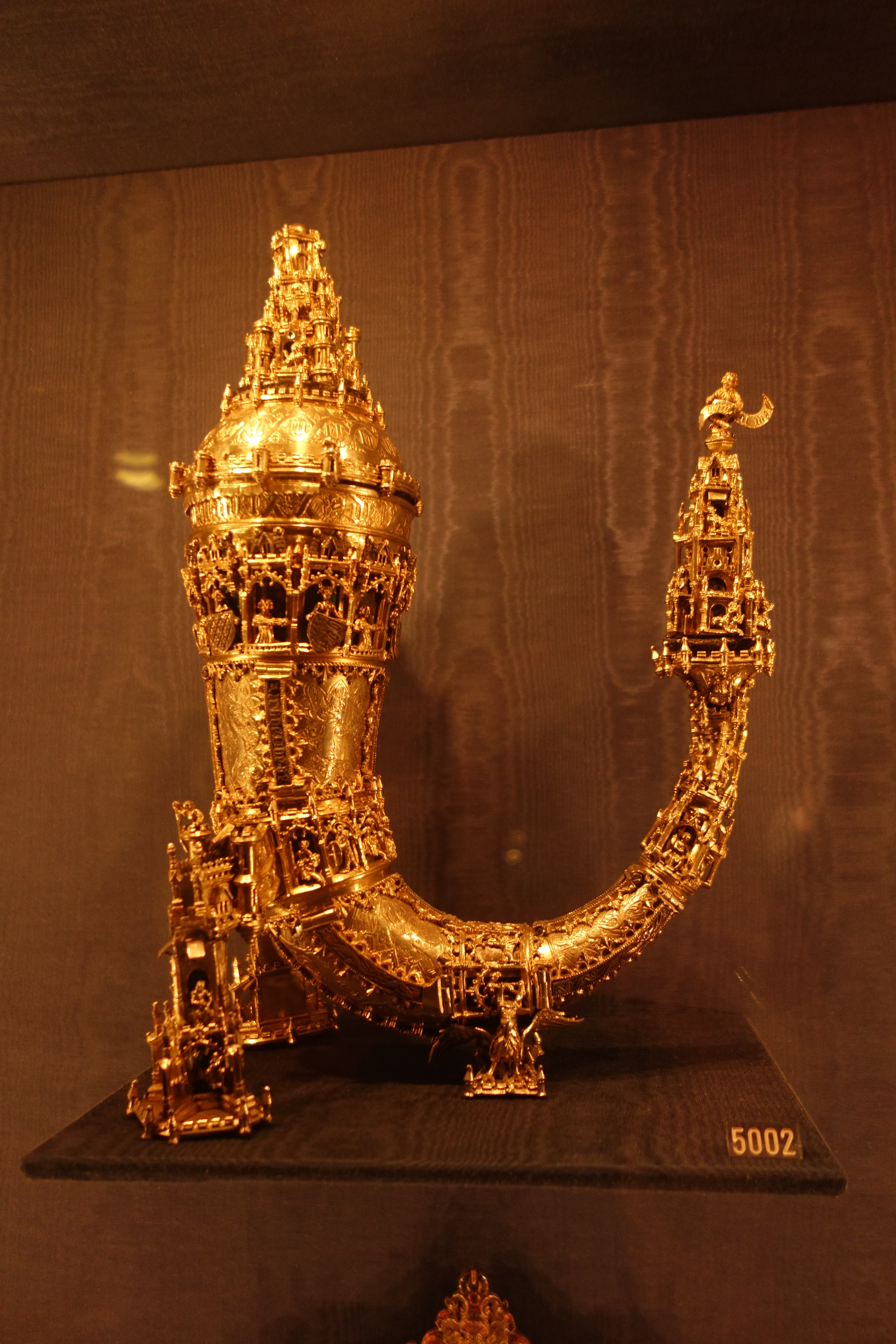
- Material: Silver
- Created: c. 1465
- Present location: Rosenborg Castle

The Oldenburg Horn (Danish: Det Oldenborgske Horn) is a mid 15th-century drinking horn with House of Oldenburg associations, made of gilded silver richly decorated with enamel, now on display in Rosenborg Castle in Copenhagen, Denmark.

== History ==
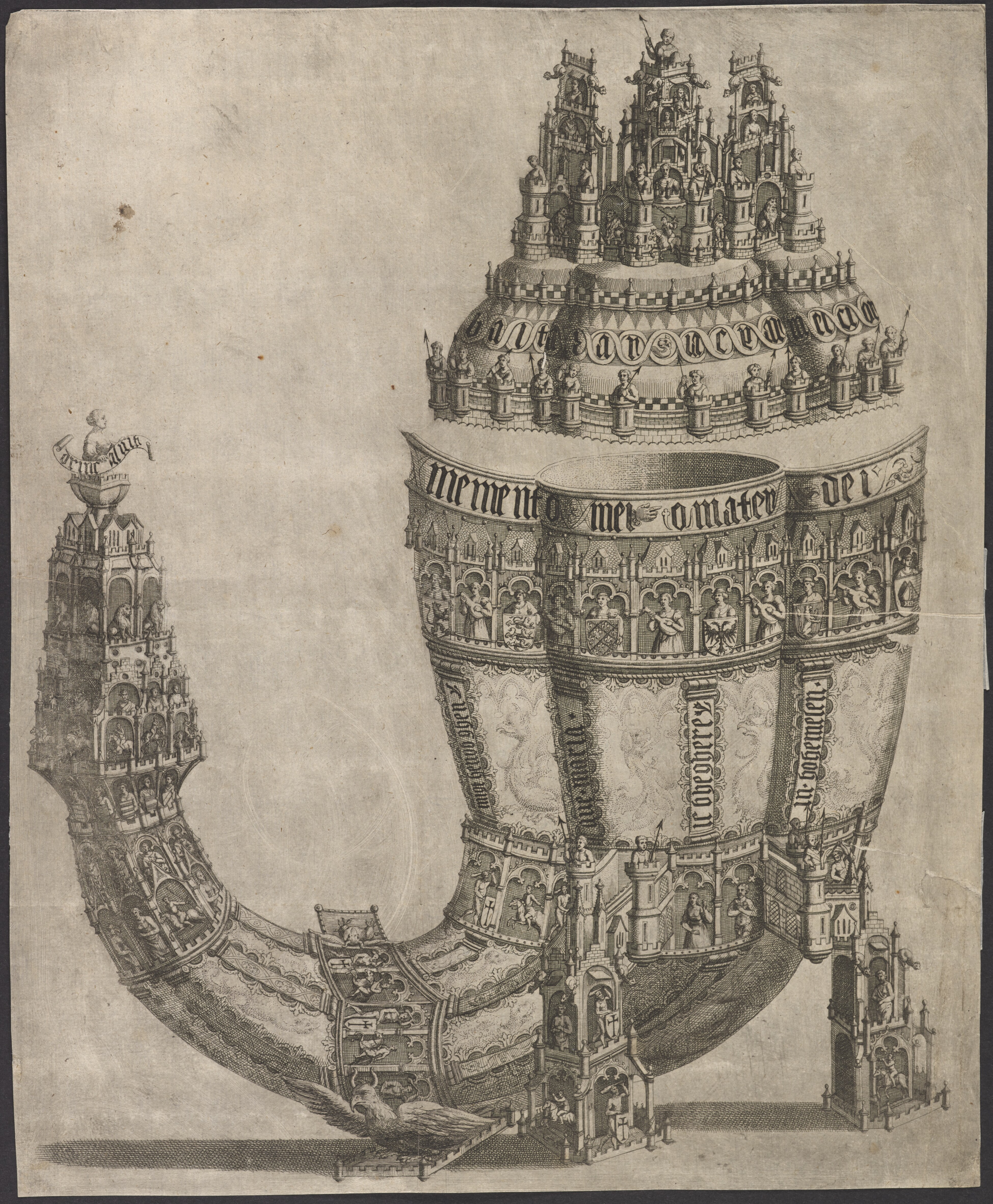
The horn seen on an old print.

In the 13th and 14th centuries, drinking horns were treasured objects and prized heirlooms among the elite. It was not uncommon for them to be regularly recycled inside close families and kin-groups. The Oldenburg Horn stands out from these earlier drinking horns, being the first such horn in Denmark not made from a bovine horn. It was made for Christian I of Denmark by an unknown silversmith in around 1465. It is believed that he intended to use it as a gift to the Three Kings in Cologne Cathedral on his journey to Rome in 1474–1475. Some sources state that he brought it back with him. In 1690, it was transferred from Oldenburg to Copenhagen by Christian V for inclusion in the Royal Collections at Rosenborg Castle. In 1939, Rosenborg Castle was opened to the public.

== Description ==
The horn is made of gilded silver and enamel, richly decorated with architectural motifs, inscriptions and Christian I's many coats of arms.

== Legend ==
A legend used to date the horn to the year 989: when Otto, 1st Count of Oldenburg became thirsty, on a hunting excursion with his men, he said, "Oh God, I wish I had something to drink". An elf maiden suddenly appeared.

In 1862, Frederik Storch painted a scene illustrating the legend. It is now in the collection of the National Gallery of Denmark.

== Gallery ==
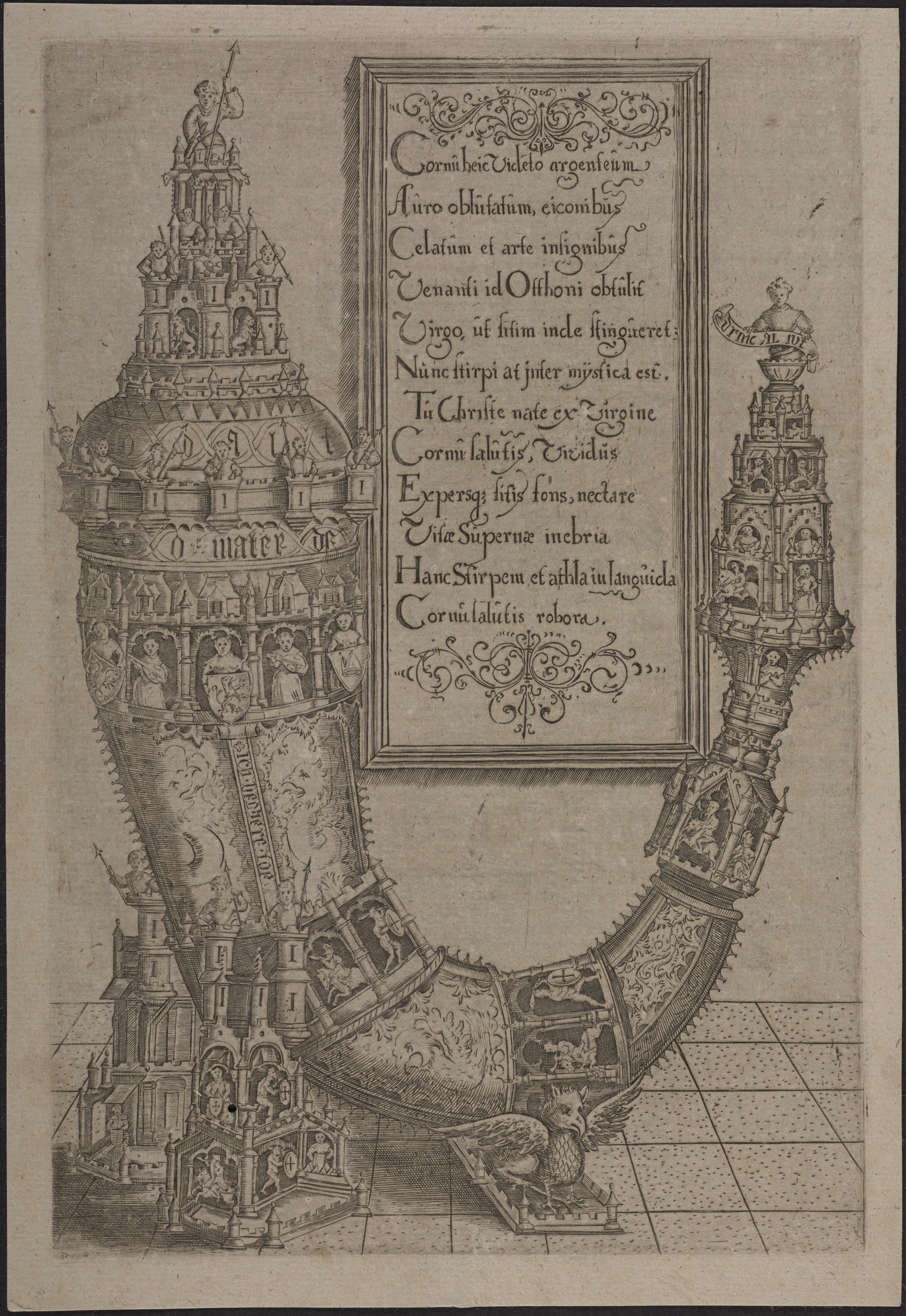
Old print presenting the Otto I legend

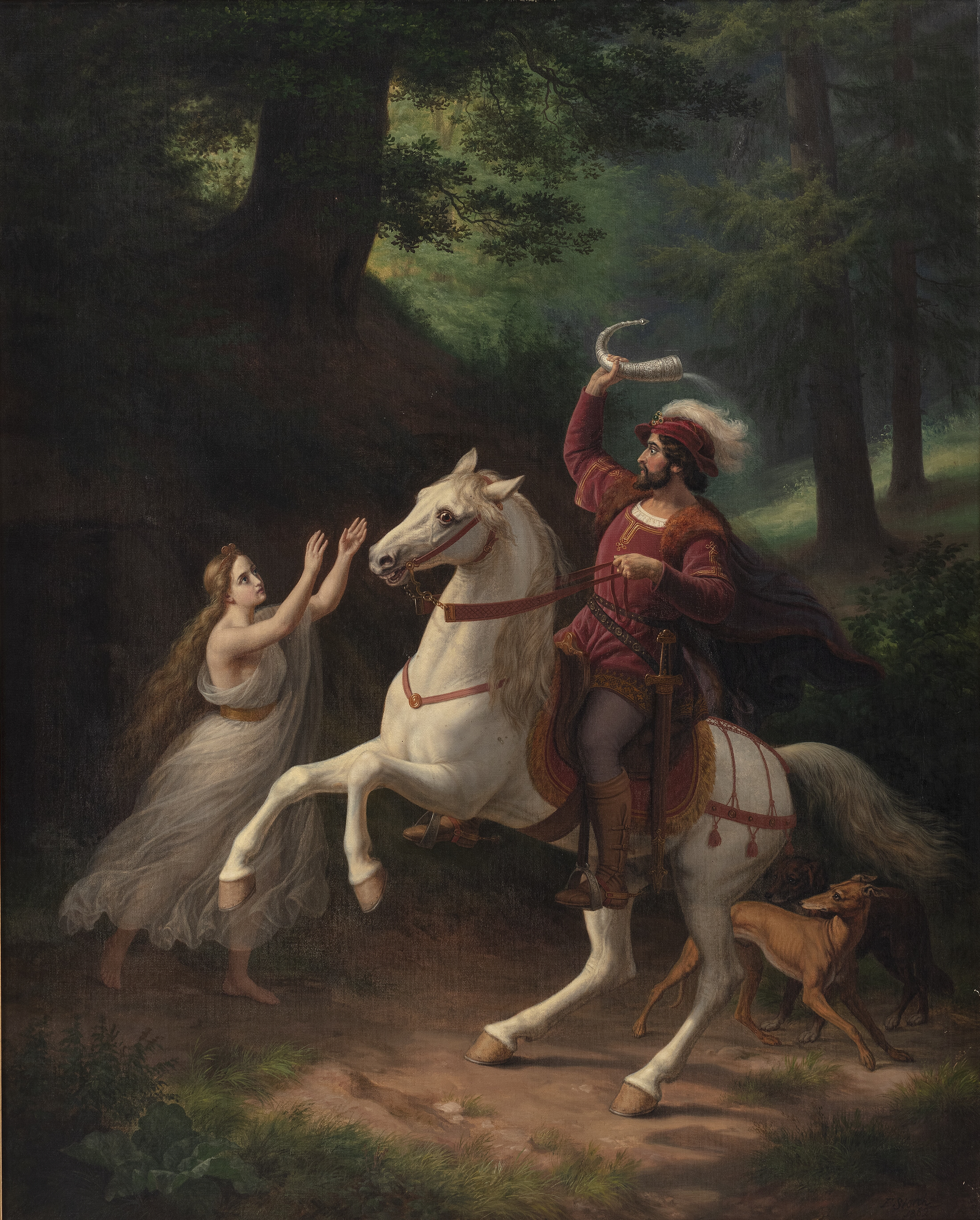
Frederik Storch's 1862 painting of the Otto I legend.

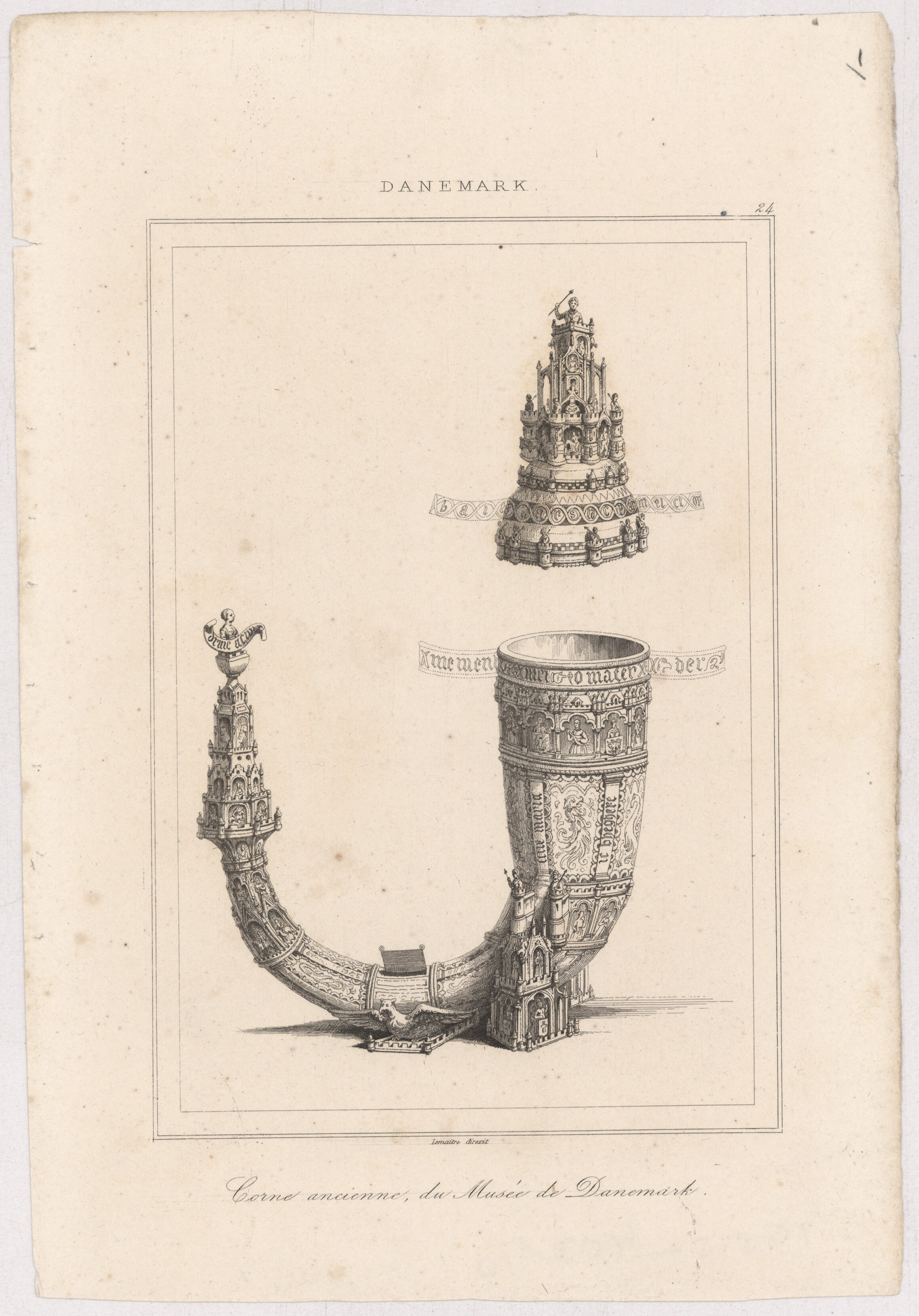
Augustin François Lemaître: Corne ancienne, du Musée de Danemark

== See also ==
- Absalon's Drinking Horn
- Rose Flower Cup
