= Rosenborg Castle =

Renaissance castle in Copenhagen, Denmark

- Rosenborg Slot
- Rosenborg Castle seen from the Castle Gardens

- Location within Copenhagen Location within Denmark

General information
- Architectural style: Dutch Renaissance
- Location: Copenhagen, Denmark
- Coordinates: 55°41′8″N 12°34′40″E
- Construction started: 1606
- Completed: 1624
- Client: Christian IV

Design and construction
- Architects: Hans van Steenwinckel the Younger, Bertel Lange

Rosenborg Castle (Danish: Rosenborg Slot) is a renaissance castle in Copenhagen, Denmark. The castle was originally built as a country summerhouse in 1606 and is an example of Christian IV's many architectural projects. It was built in the Dutch Renaissance style, typical of Danish buildings during this period, and has been expanded several times, finally evolving into its present condition by the year 1624. Architects Bertel Lange and Hans van Steenwinckel the Younger are associated with the structural planning of the castle.

== History ==
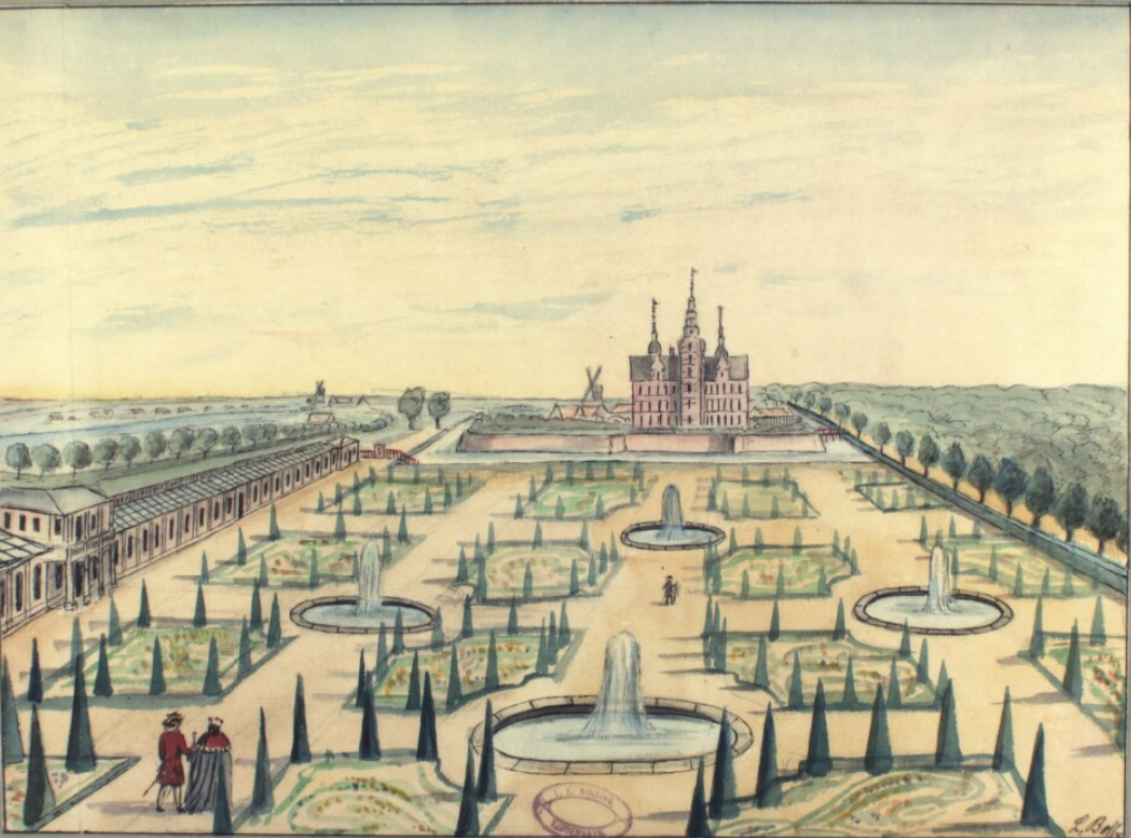
Rosenborg Castle seen from Gothersgade in 1749

The castle was used by Danish regents as a royal residence until around 1710. After the reign of Frederik IV, Rosenborg was used as a royal residence only twice, and both these times were during emergencies. The first time was after Christiansborg Palace burned down in 1794, and the second time was during the British attack on Copenhagen in 1801.

== Architecture ==
=== Long Hall ===
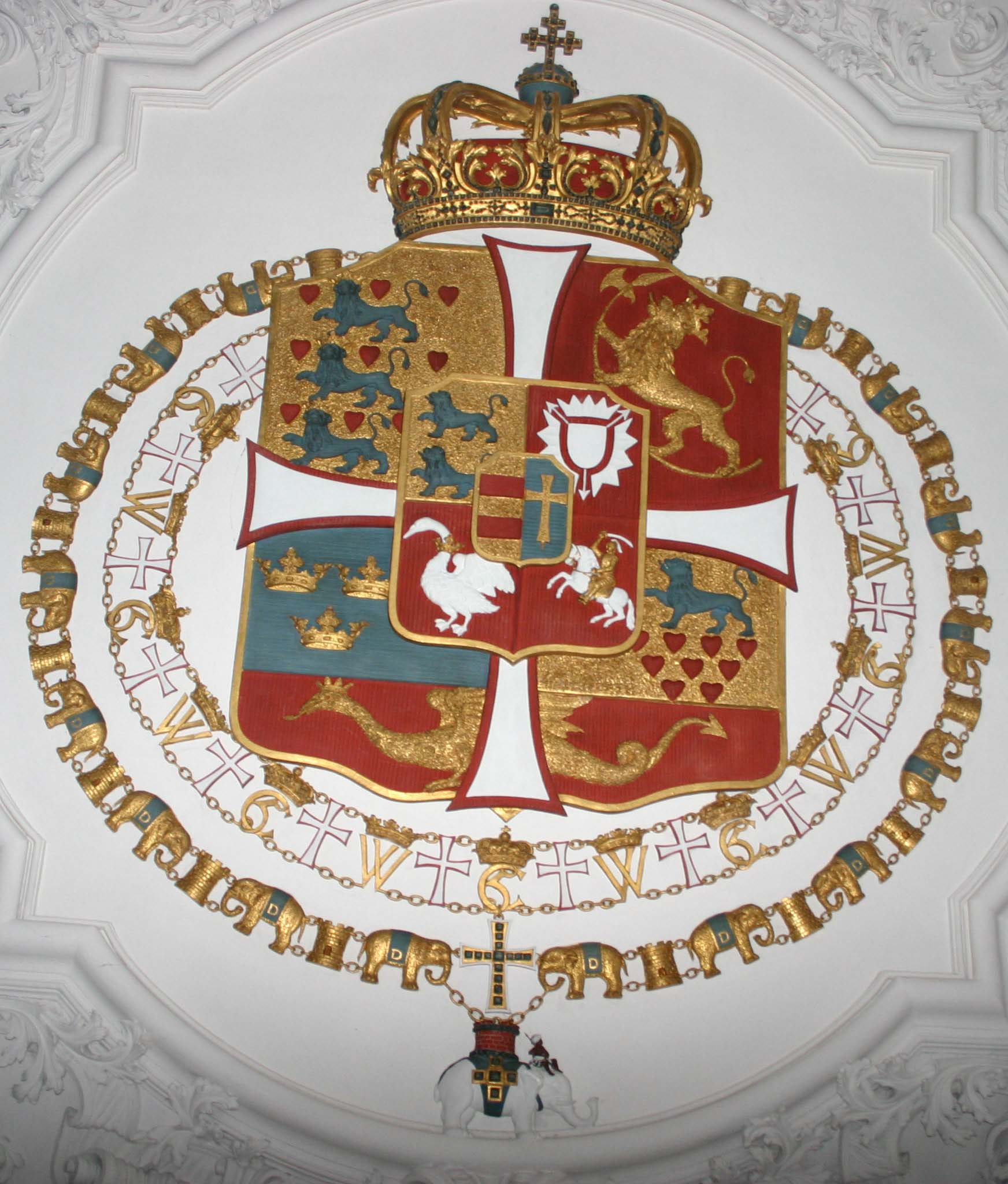
The Coat of arms of Denmark is located on the ceiling of the Long Hall

Located on the third floor, the Long Hall was completed in 1624. It was originally intended as a ballroom. Around 1700 it was used as Royal Reception Room and for banquets. It was not until the second half of the 19th century that it became known as the "Knight's Hall".

Christian V had the hall partly modernised with twelve tapestries depicting the King's victories in the Scanian War (1675–1679). The stucco ceiling seen today is from the beginning of the 18th century. It shows the Danish Coat of Arms surrounded by the Orders of the Elephant and of Dannebrog. Side reliefs depict historical events from the first years of the reign of Frederik IV, including the liberation of the serfs, the founding of the dragoons and of the land militia among them. The frescos in the ceiling by Hendrick Krock, represent the Regalia.

Among the main attractions of Rosenborg are the coronation chair of the absolutist kings and the throne of the queens with the three silver lions standing in front. The Long Hall also contains a large collection of silver furniture, of which most is from the 17th century.

== Rosenborg Collections ==
Danish Royal Regalia and Crown Jewels

The castle is open to the public for tours and houses a museum exhibiting the Royal Collections, artifacts spanning a breadth of royal Danish culture, from the late 16th century of Christian IV to the 19th century. Some of these articles once belonged to the nobility and the aristocracy. The castle, now state property, was opened to the public in 1838.

Of special interest to tourists is a treasury displaying the Crown Jewels and the Danish Crown Regalia located in the castle. A Coronation Carpet is also stored there. The Throne Chair of Denmark is located in the castle. In the summer time, flowers bloom in front of the castle in the castle garden.

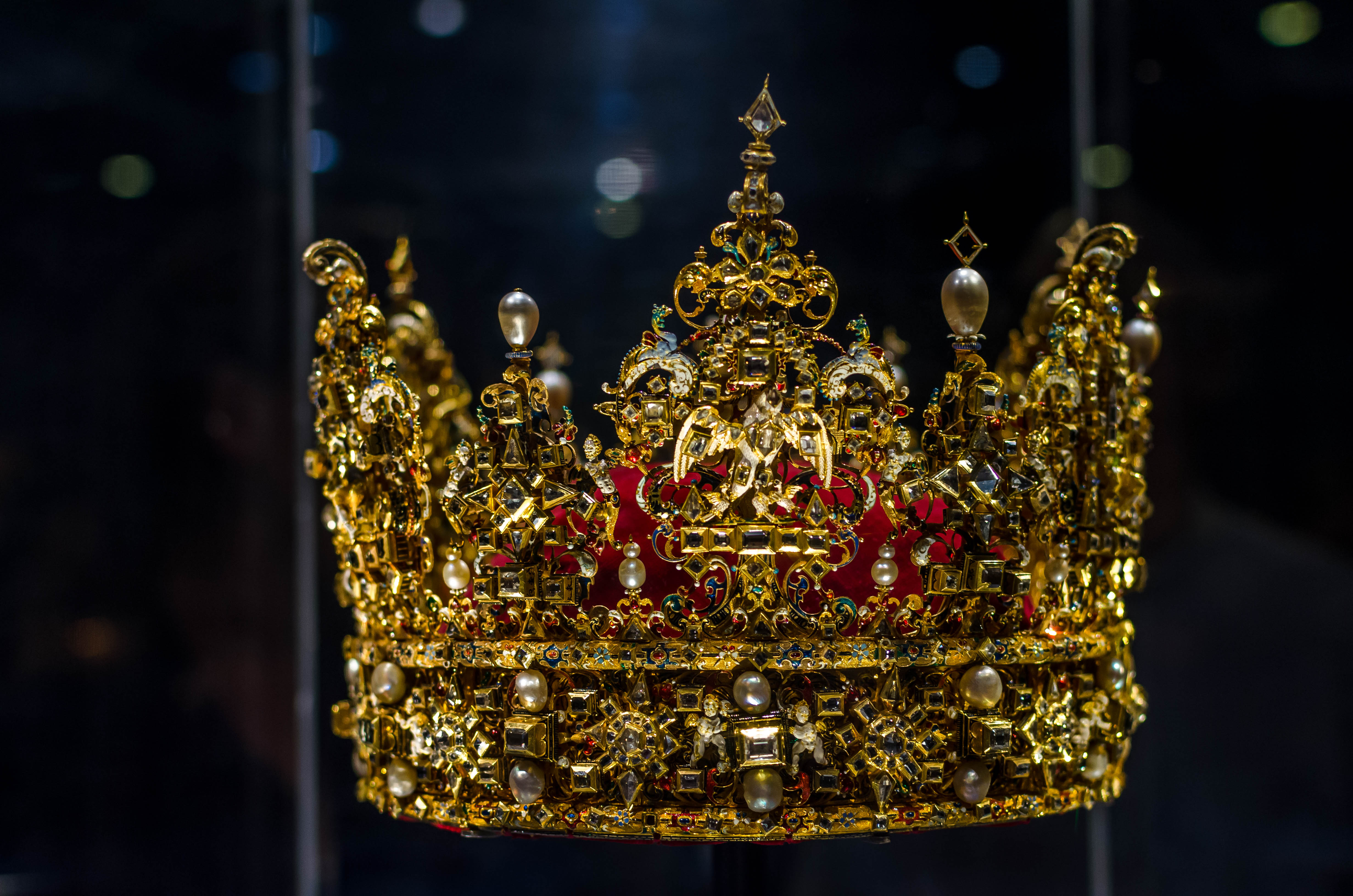
The Crown of Christian IV

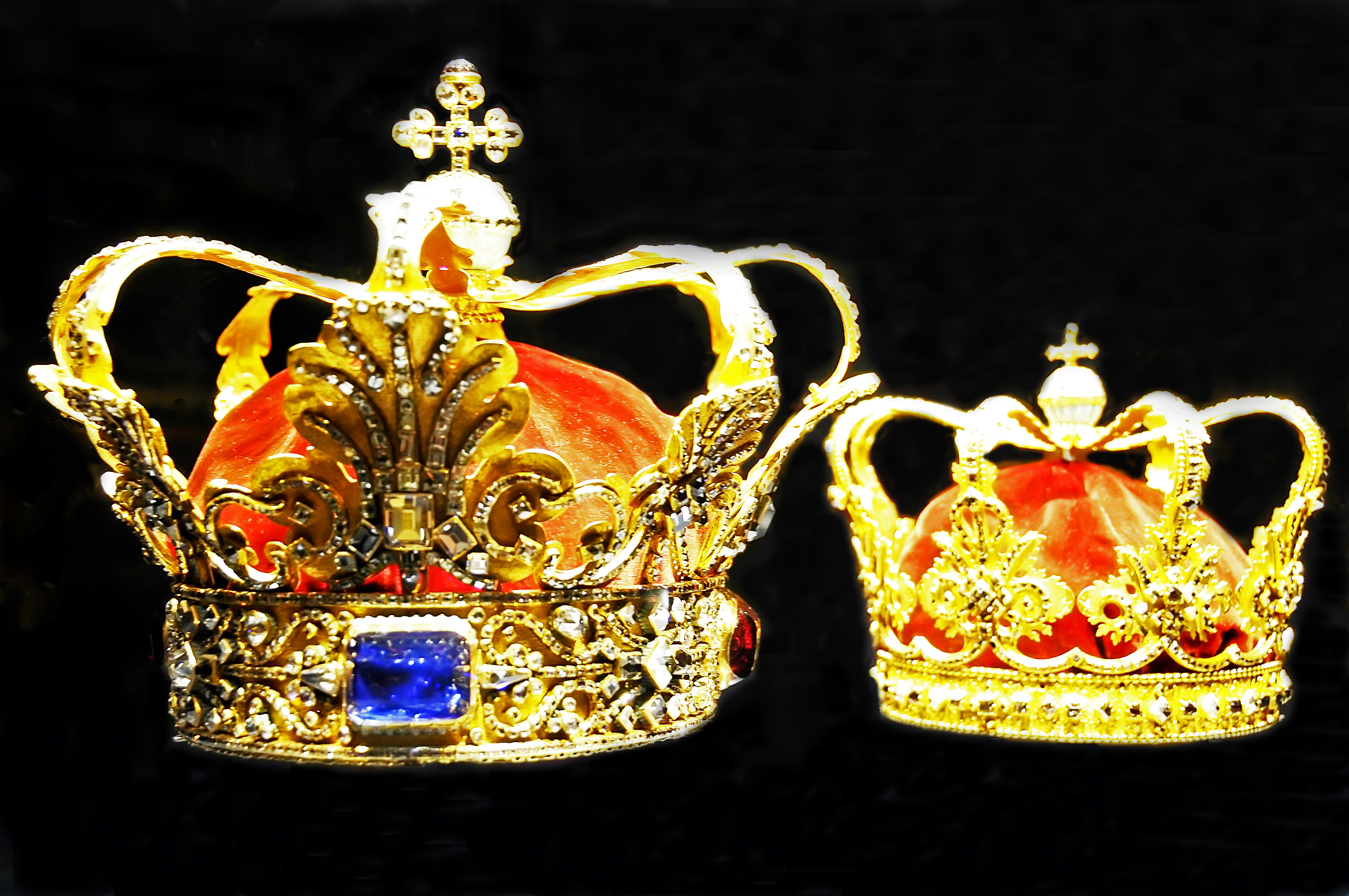
Crown of Christian V (Large crown) Queen's Crown (Small crown). The Queen's Crown was created in 1731 for Queen Sophie Magdalene

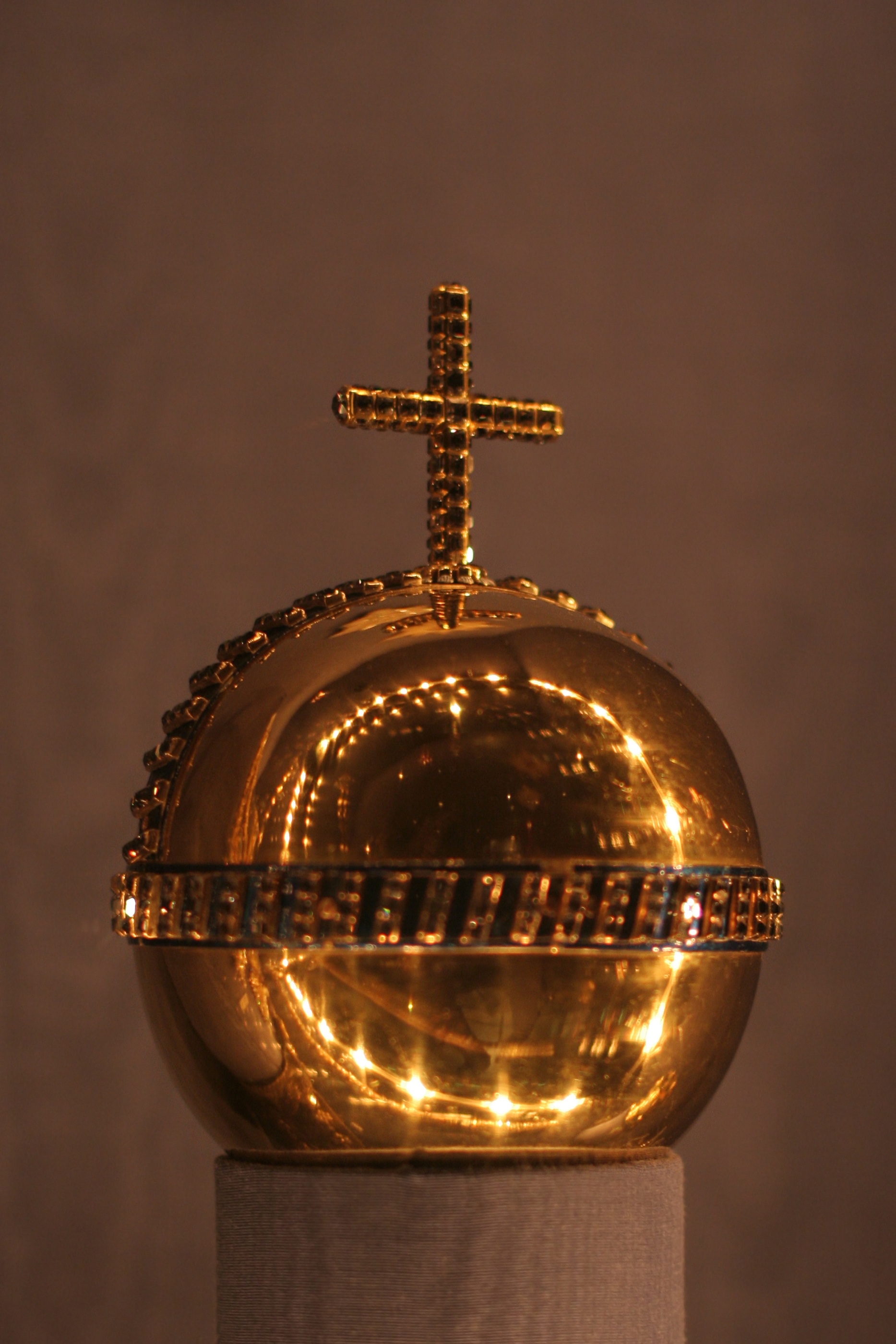
The Danish globus cruciger (or royal orb), where it was crafted in 1648 for the coronation of King Frederick III

The Golden Sceptre is a historic golden tube created in 1648 for the coronation of King Frederick III

Christian III's Sword of State is a 16th-century ceremonial weapon

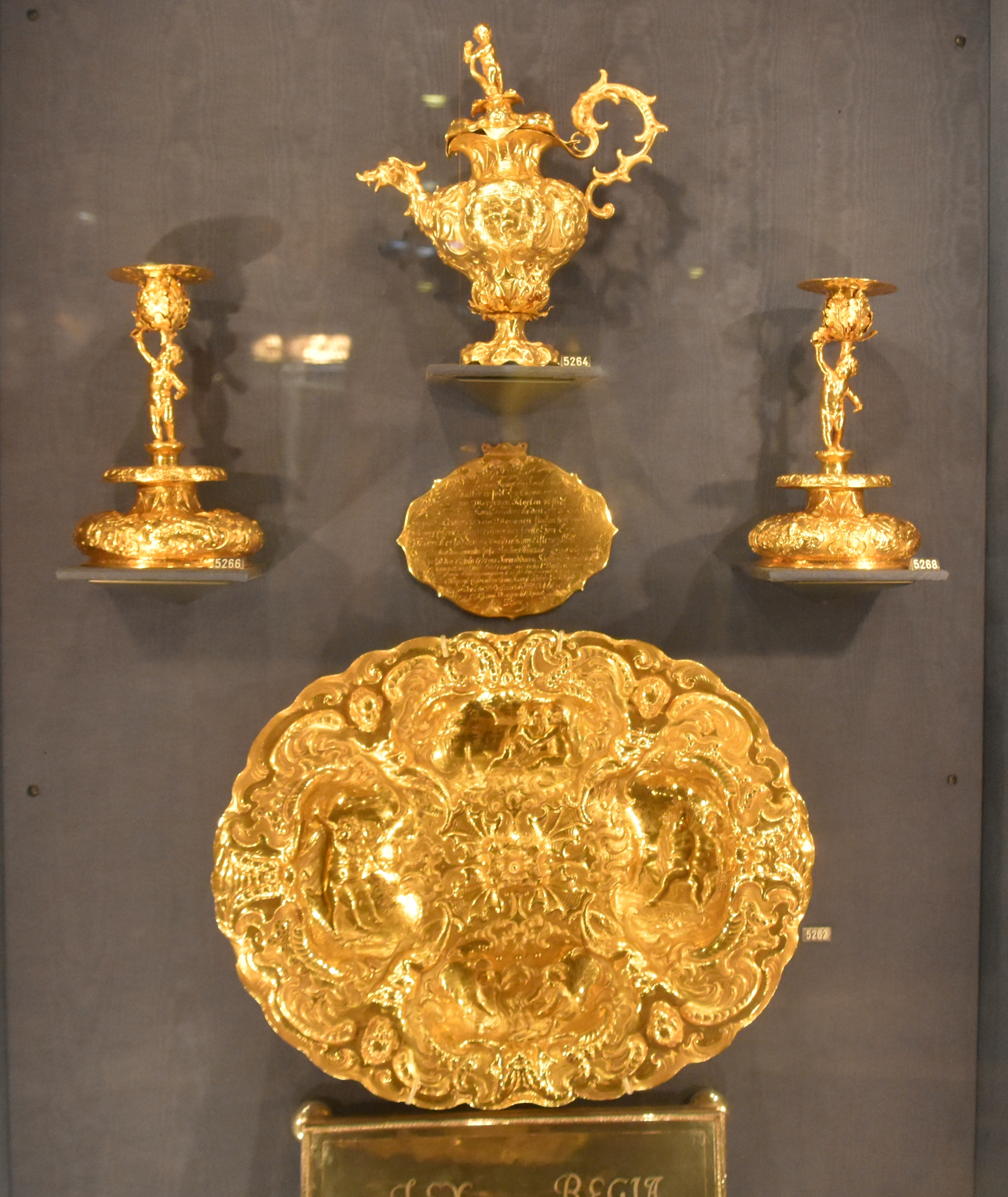
The Danish royal baptismal set

Gilt war game set with miniature infantry and cavalry

== Gardens ==
Parterre garden in the Rosenborg Castle Gardens

The castle is situated in Kongens Have ("The King's Garden"), also known as "Rosenborg Castle Garden". The Rosenborg Castle Garden is the country's oldest royal garden and was embellished in the Renaissance style by Christian IV shortly before the construction of the main castle. Today, the gardens are a popular retreat for the people of Copenhagen, and attract an estimated 2.5 million visitors every year. Next to the castle are barracks where the Royal Life Guards is garrisoned. The Life Guard guards the castle.

== Gallery ==
Exterior view of the Dutch Renaissance-style

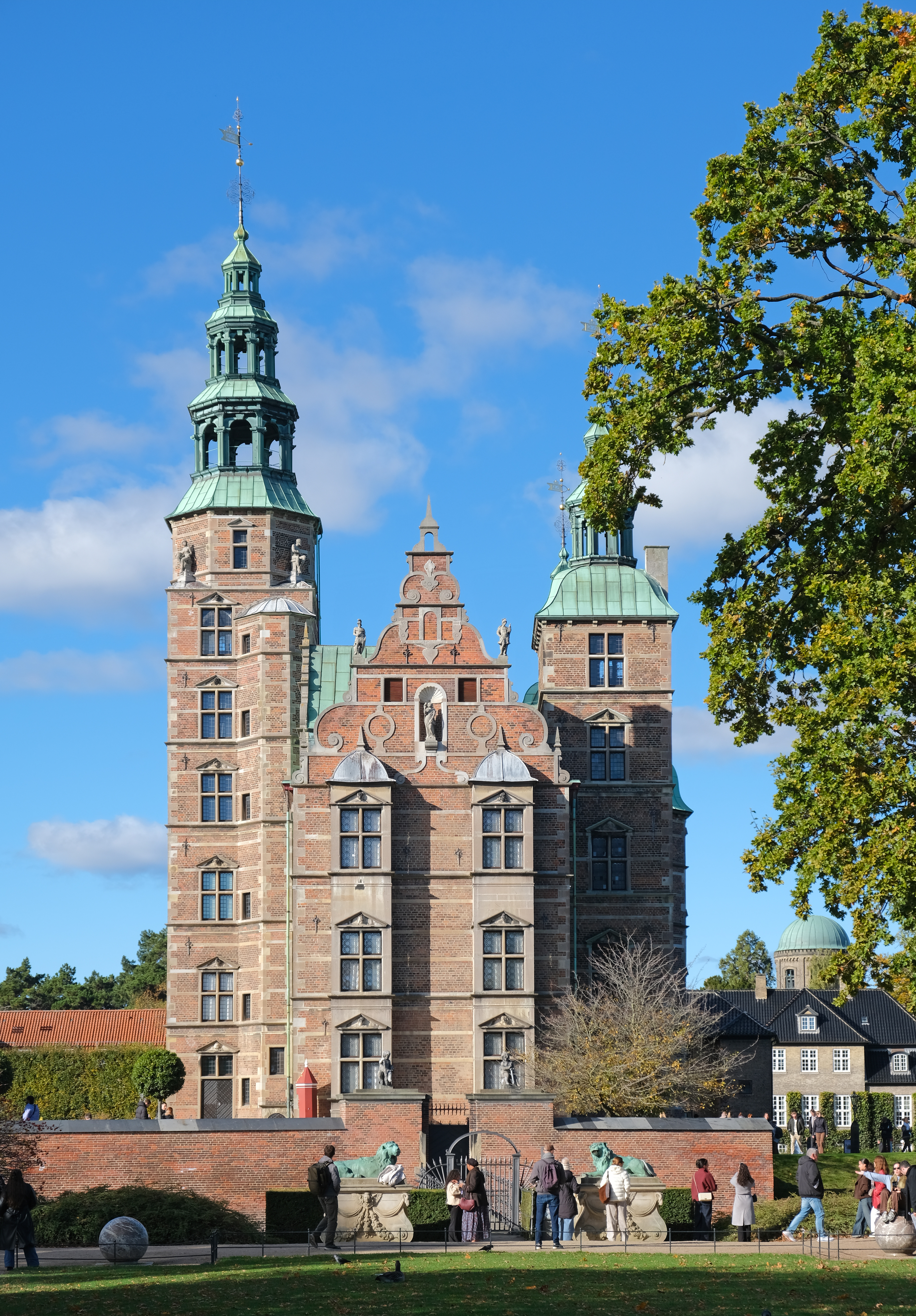
Frontal view

View from the west

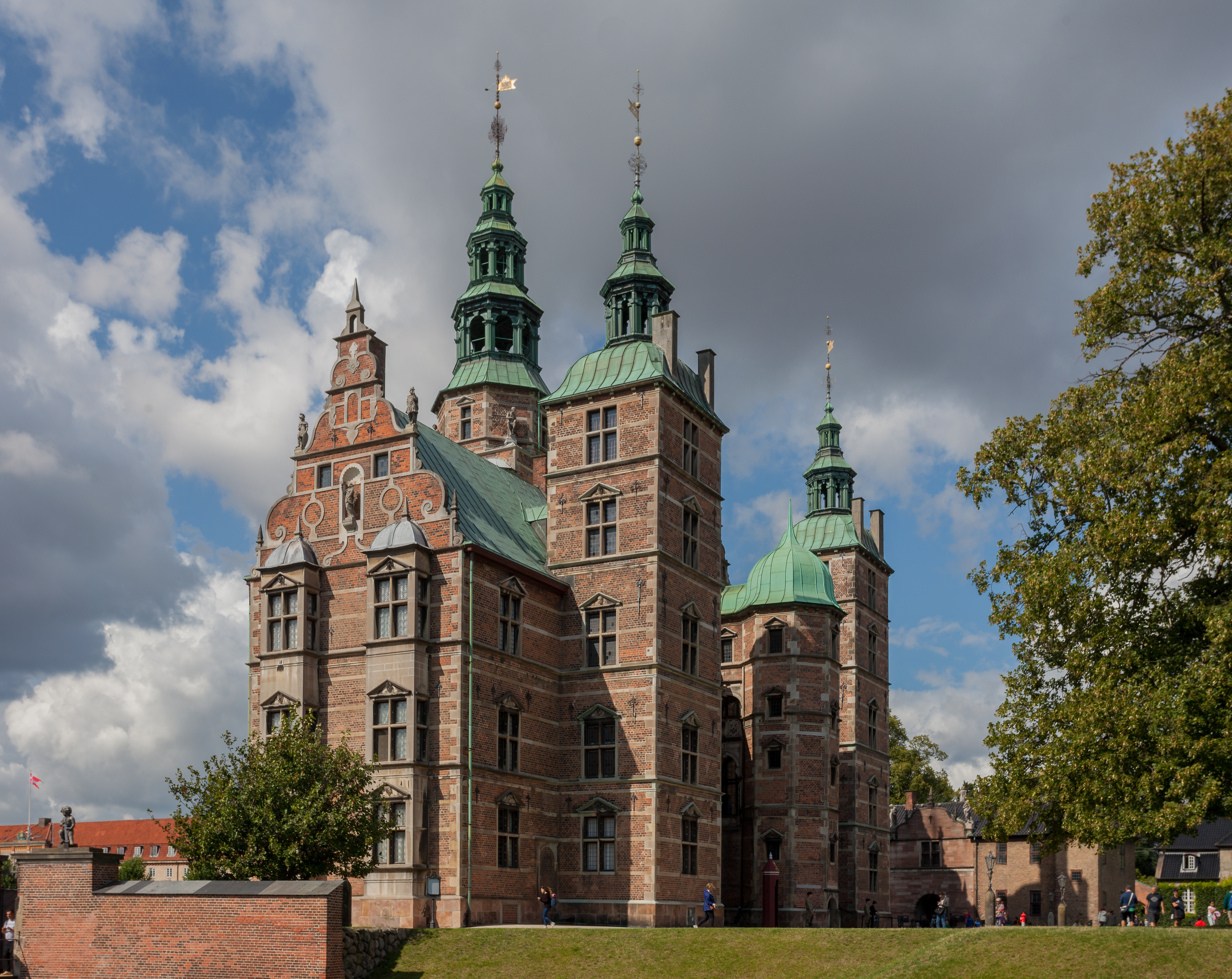
Right view

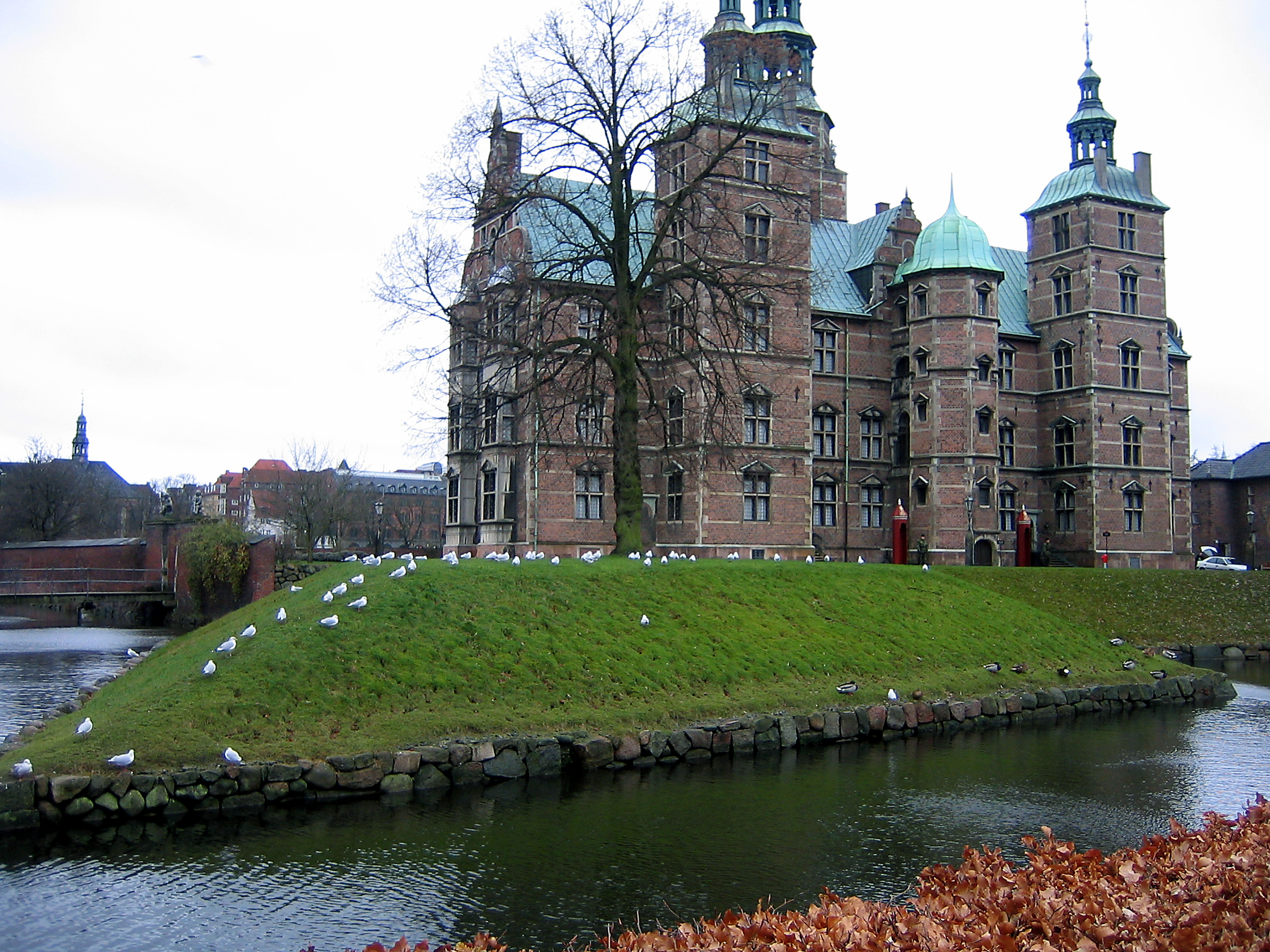
Rear of Rosenborg Castle

The Knights' Hall

The Coronation Chair of Denmark on display inside the Knights' Hall

The Silver Lions were created by artist Ferdinand Kübich between 1665 and 1670. Crafted from solid silver with partial gilding

Christian IV's Writing Room

Stone Corridor

Genealogical chart of Christian IV

The historical royal toilet, featuring traditional Dutch Delftware tiles

== See also ==
- List of castles and palaces in Denmark
- Tourism in Denmark
- Oldenburg Horn
