= Rose Flower Cup =

Large silver-gilt communal drinking vessel

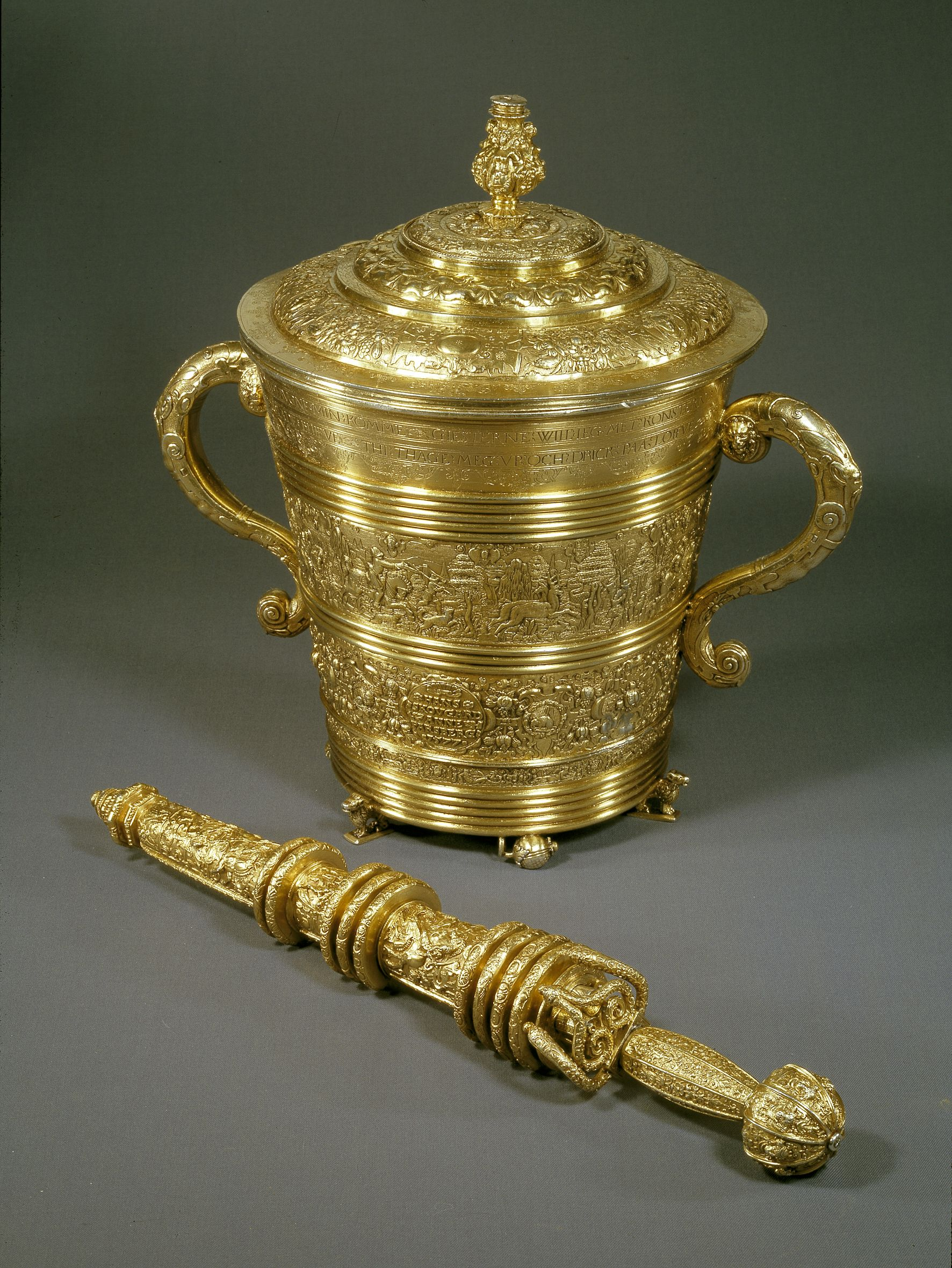
- Material: Silver-gilt
- Created: 1577
- Present location: National Museum of Denmark

The Rose Flower Cup (Danish: Rosenblommen) is a large silver-gilt communal drinking vessel, with two handles and a detached cover, holding six litres and weighing almost 6 kilograms (13 lb), presented to the future King Christian IV of Denmark at his christening in 1577 by his godfather Hans Skovgaard and his wife Anne Parsberg. The name refers to a verse inscribed on the exterior of the vessel. It is now in the National Museum of Denmark.

== History ==
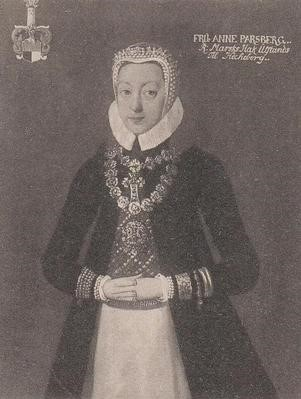
Anne Parsberg

Hans Skovgaard (1526–1580), one of King Frederick II's favourites, served as secretary of the Danish Chancellery and was generously rewarded with royal fiefs. In 1573, one year before marrying Anne Parsberg (1549–1582), against the wishes of the king, he retired from the royal court to his estate Gunderstrup in Scania. Frederick II nonetheless hosted his wedding at Copenhagen Castle and as a wedding present gave him a richly decorated silver tankard.

When Frederik II and Queen Sophie of Mecklenburg-Güstrow had their first son, Christian (1577-1648), who would later succeed his father as Christian IV in 1588, Skovgaard was one of the prince’s godfathers. At the christening, he and his wife presented the Queen, on the prince’s behalf, with the large Rose Flower Cup. It is the only remaining gift of the godfathers.

It is unclear who made the cup. Bearing the maker's mark AE conjoined, it is however, somewhat cautiously, attributed to the Royal Goldsmith and armour maker (Plattenschlager) Aelisaeus Englander.

== Design ==
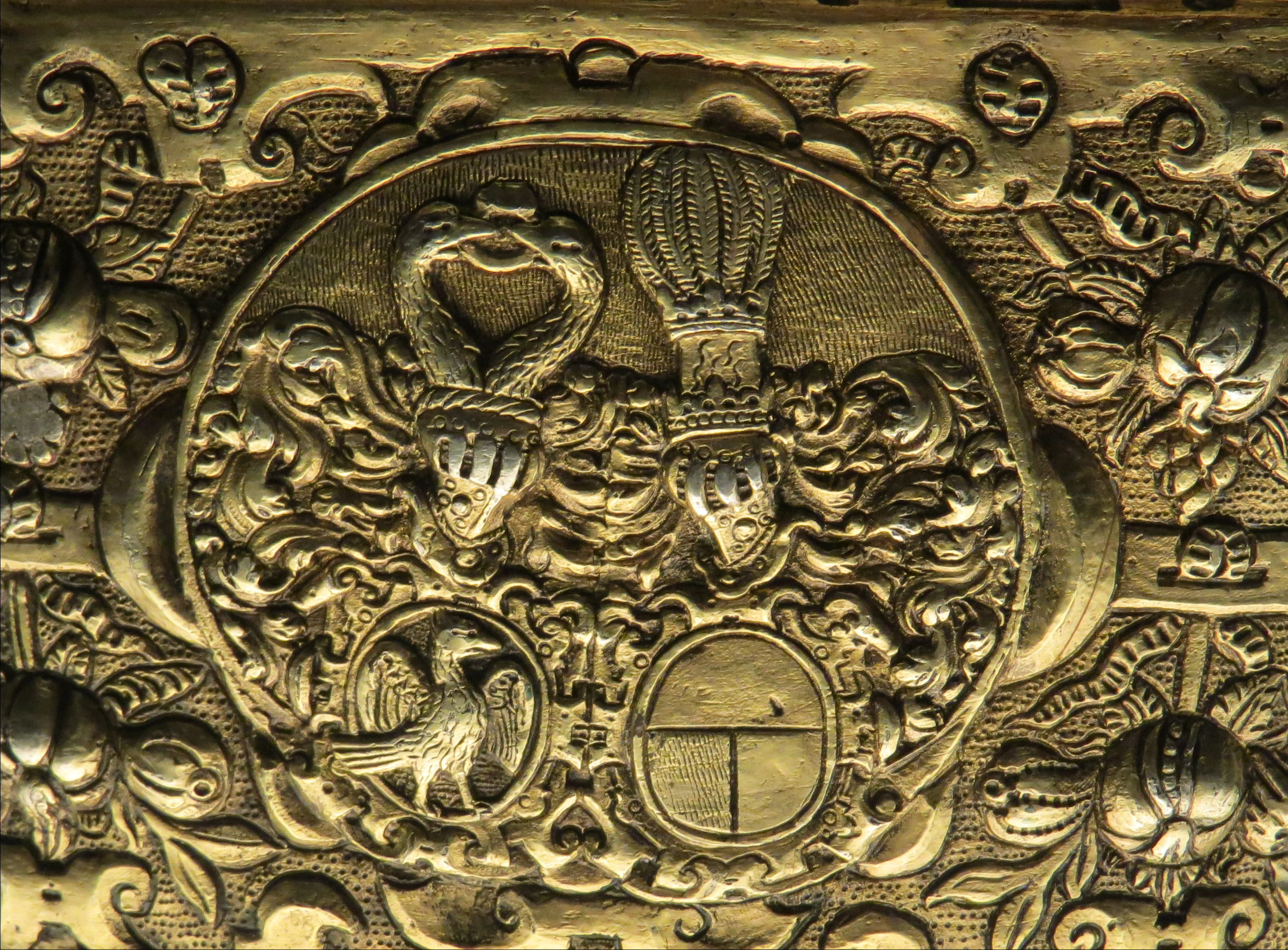
Detail

The Rose Flower Cup, which holds six litres (eight pots) and has a weight of almost six kilos, is designed in the form of a generous barrel with two handles. Compared to normal tankards, its second handle was a necessity due to its massive size. As is the case with so-called peg tankards, it is fitted on the inside with pegs at regular intervals to mark the quantity each person is supposed to drink. The exterior is decorated with hunting scenes, probably as a reference to Frederick III, who was an enthusiastic huntsman. Hans and Anne Skovgaard's coat of arms is also part of the decoration. A red and white rose has been interpreted as representing the union of the sun and the moon giving birth to the Filius philosophorum. A medallion on the interior of the cover, depicting David playing before King Saul, is most likely a reference to the recipient (Frederik) and the giver (Skovgaard). The exterior is also inscribed with the year 1577 as well as a verse:

Mit Navn det kaldes en "Rosenblomme".
Billigt bør man favne mit Komme.
Gæsterne vil jeg med Kunsterne min'
– Naar udi mig skænkes den klare Vin –
Trolign tilhjælpe Sorgen fordrive,
Saa de alle skulle glade blive.
Thi tag mig op og drik paa Love!
Det er den ret gamle Vis til Hove.

== See also ==
- Oldenburg Horn
