= Paul Kurtz (goldsmith) =

German goldsmith

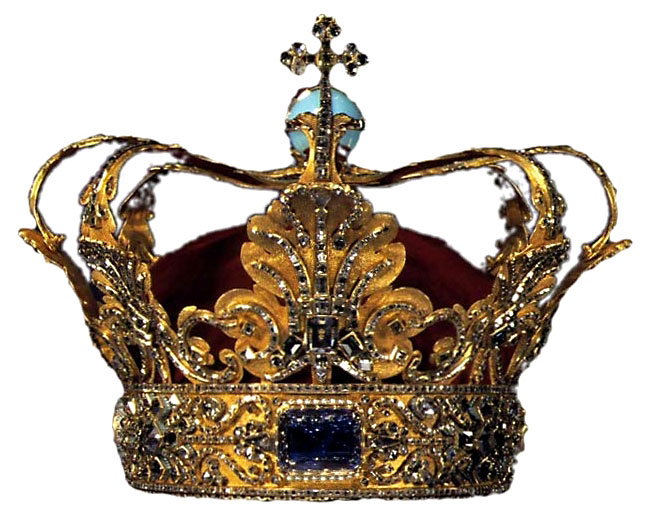
Crown of Christian V

Paul Kurtz came to Denmark from Germany in 1655. He made silver and gold items for Frederik III and was mentioned in 1659 as "the King's goldsmith".

Frederik III had large parts of his daughters' trousseau bought in Paris, which, already at that time, was a centre for European fashion. But the jewellery was commissioned to Kurtz. He was, therefore, considered an outstanding jeweller. In 1670–1671 he made his principal piece of work, Crown of Christian V. The closed shape was inspired by the crown of Louis XIV of France, but Kurtz replaced the lily-shaped points of the French crown with palmettes and adorned the crown with a row of diamonds intertwined with palmette and acanthus. In that way a "white" play of light was created, which was framed by blue and red in the sapphires and garnets of the crown ring and the orb and cross in the top.

After the death of Kurtz his studio was continued by his wife and his son Frederik, who was commissioned as Court goldsmith in 1676.
