= Crown of Christian IV =

Part of the Crown Regalia of Denmark

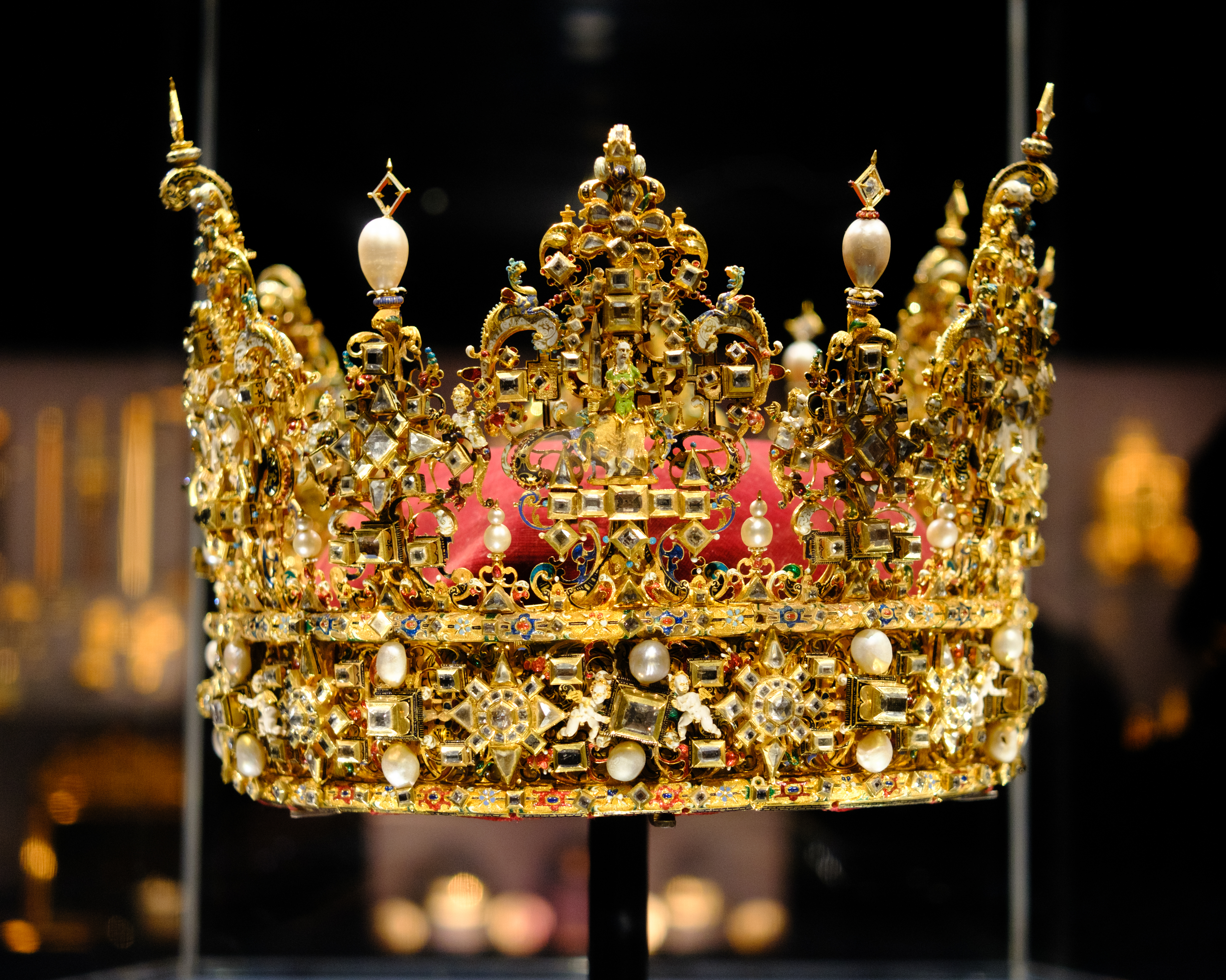
- The Crown of Christian IV

Details
- Country: Denmark (Denmark-Norway)
- Made: 1596
- Owner: Government of Denmark
- Weight: 2.895 kg (6.38 lb)
- Arches: None
- Material: Gold
- Cap: Red
- Notable stones: Pearls
- Successors: Crown of Christian V

The Crown of Christian IV, created for the coronation of Christian IV of Denmark-Norway, on 29 August 1596, is the older of the two surviving crowns of Denmark. Only used for one more coronation, that of his son, Frederick III, in 1648, it is together with the other Danish crown jewels now on display in the Royal Danish Treasury at Rosenborg Castle.

== Description ==
The crown is made of gold, enamel, table cut gemstones and pearls. It has a maximum diameter of 25 cm (9.8 in), measures 17.8 cm (7.0 in) tall, and weighs 2.835 kg (6.25 lb). The circlet is ornamented with six sets of table cut diamonds between two large round pearls with enameled putti on either side. Between each of these sets are star-like ornaments of triangular and square table cut diamonds. On the upper rim of the circlet are six large and six small arabesque-like points. At the center of each of the larger points is an enameled allegorical figure of one of the king's ruling functions and virtues. The three points above the king's forehead and behind each of his ears bears a "pelican in her piety." The point on the right of the king's forehead bears a representation of Fortitude riding a lion, while that on the left bears the image of Justice as a woman holding a sword and a pair of scales. The point above the back of the king's neck bears the traditional image of Charity as a mother suckling her child. The six smaller points each bears a star-like design in triangular and square table diamonds with a large pear shaped pearl at its top.

On the inside these points were decorated with the coats of arms of various regions of the realm, featuring the Three Lions of Denmark (supported by two putti), Standing Lion of Norway, Lion of the Goths, Three Crowns of the Kalmar Union, Lindworm of the Vends, Lamb of Gotland, Stockfish of Iceland, Two Lions of Schleswig, Nettle Leaf of Holstein, Swan of Stormarn, Knight of Holstein, Bars of Oldenburg, Cross of Delmenhorst and Eagle of Ösel. Following Denmark's territorial losses in 1645, a result of the Peace of Brömsebro, some of these coats of arms were removed.

By the time the crown was made, open crowns had already fallen out of fashion at European courts. The decision to nonetheless make an open crown may have relied on a wish to stress the historical links with the three open crowns of the Kalmar Union.

== History ==
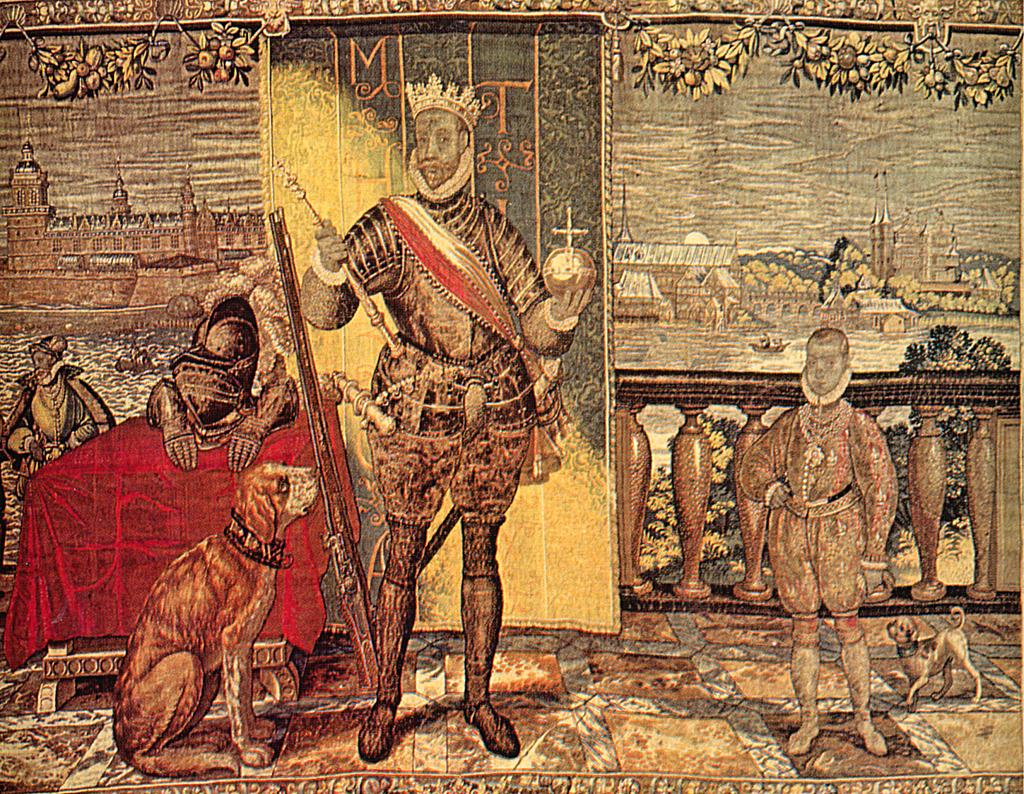
Prince Christian (IV) with his father Frederick II wearing the old crown, seen on one of the Kronborg Tapestries.

At the death of his father on 4 April 1588, Christian IV was just 11 years old. He succeeded to the throne, but as he was still underage, a regency council was set up to serve as the trustees of the royal power while Christian was still growing up. In 1595, the Council of the Realm decided that Christian would soon be old enough to assume personal control of the reins of government. For the upcoming coronation ceremony it was decided to commission a new crown. The new crown was made in the Odense workshop of Dirich Fyring (1580–1603) with assistance from the Nuremberg goldsmith Corvinianus Saur during the years 1595–1596.

In December 1595, Christian IV traveled to Skanderborg Castle by way of Kalundborg and Aarhus, using the ferry service which he himself had set up. On 27 December, Hans Mikkelsen, royal treasurer (rentemester), was sent from Aarhus to Copenhagen to pick up the old crown in Copenhagen. It was the responsibility of the privy councillors to oversee the royal regalia, which were then kept in the cellar vault of Copenhagen Castle. On 26 January 1596 a smith in Aarhus received payment for having manufactured a strongbox for the royal regalia. By 30 January, Christian IV had continued to Koldinghus. On 4 February, by messenger, Dirich Fyring was called to Kolding to meet with the king, officially to discuss the commission of a set silver trumpets but in reality to discuss the new crown.

On 29 August 1596, Christian IV was crowned at the Church of Our Lady in Copenhagen by the Bishop of Zealand, Peder Jensen Vinstrup (1549–1614). He was crowned with the new Crown Regalia which had been made for him by Dirich Fyring.

In August 1628, Christian IV pawned the crown and other royal regalia with three Holstein noblemen. Christian IV's own regalia were later redeemed, unlike the old regalia of which only Frederick III's Sword of State seems to have been redeemed. In 1633, Christian IV had a crown repaired in Hamburg.

During the Torstenson War, when Denmark was again on the verge of bankruptcy, Christian IV had his crown and other royal regalia once again pawned as security for a 15,000 rigsdaler loan from Gabriel Marselis the Elder in Hamburg. The crown therefore had to be redeemed from a banker in Hamburg for the coronation of Frederik III in 1648. Frederick III chose to have it modernized by having it closed with arches, monde and cross.

Christian V, prior to his own coronation, removed the arches and other alterations again, using the diamonds and gold from them in the making of his own, closed crown.
