= Coronation Carpet =

Danish royal Persian carpet

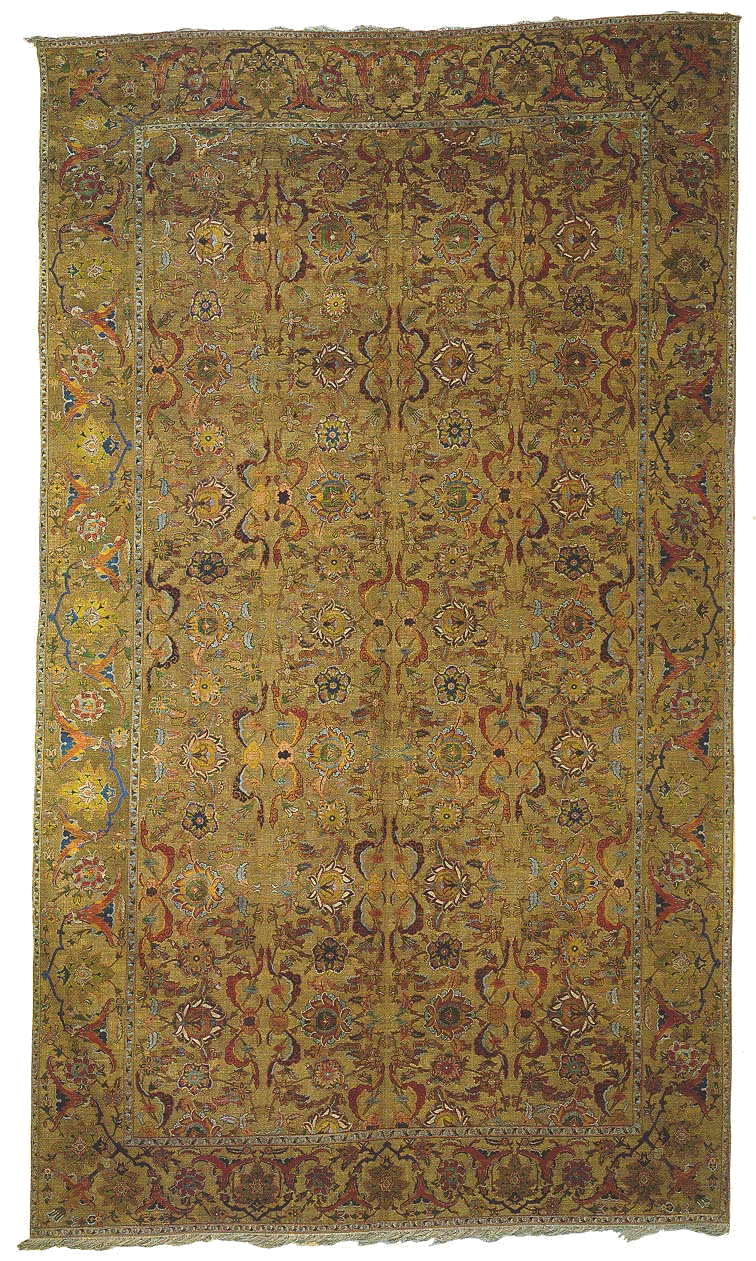
The Coronation Carpet

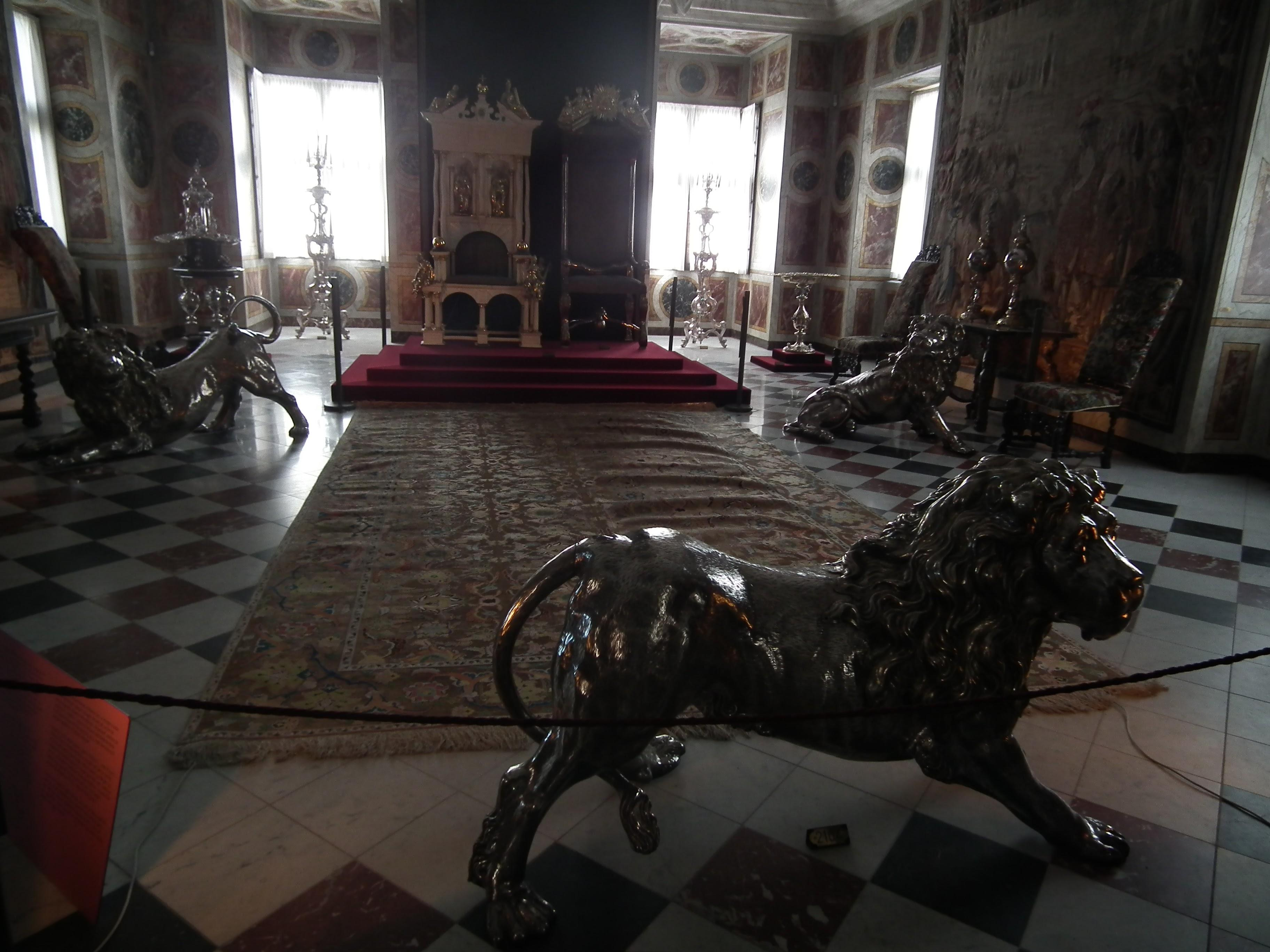
The Coronation Carpet in front of the throne in Rosenborg Castle.

The Coronation Carpet is a Persian carpet owned by the Danish royal family. It is stored at Rosenborg Castle in Copenhagen. According to the Royal Danish Collections, the carpet was made in Isfahan, capital of Safavid Iran, in the 17th century. The size is 12 feet, 2 inches by 17 feet, 1 inch. As the name suggests, it is the carpet on which Danish kings were anointed.

The carpet is made of silk pile and gold and silver threads.

The Coronation Carpet is only shown to the public once a year during Easter together with a small group of chenille carpets.
