= Crown of Christian V =

Since 1671, the official crown of the Kingdom of Denmark

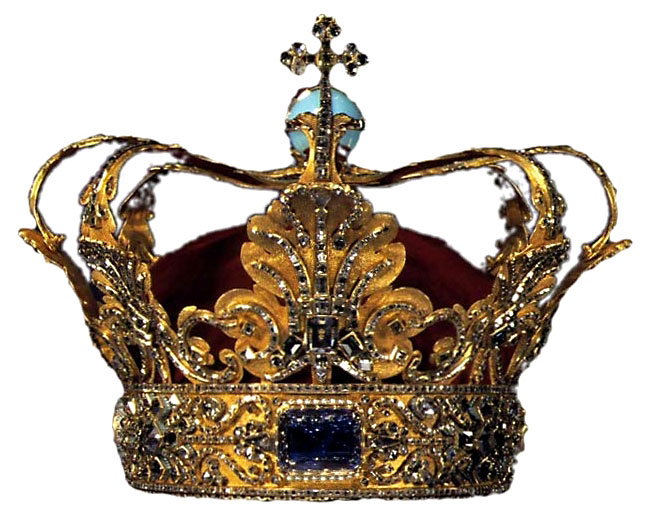
- Crown of Christian V

Heraldic depictions

Details
- Country: Denmark (Denmark-Norway)
- Made: 1671
- Owner: the Government of Denmark
- Weight: 2.08 kg (4.6 lb)
- Arches: 8
- Material: Gold, enamel
- Cap: Red velvet
- Notable stones: 2 garnets 2 sapphires
- Predecessors: Crown of Christian IV

The Crown of Christian V of Denmark was the crown used at the coronation of all of Denmark's absolutist kings. While the reign of such monarchs ended in 1849, the crown is still used during a Danish king's castrum doloris, the last time in 1972. Used by the kings from Christian V to Christian VIII. The crown was made by Paul Kurtz in Copenhagen, 1670–1671. It is made of gold with enamel and table-cut stones, weighting in total 2080 g. The jewel also contains 2 garnets and 2 sapphires, of which the largest dates back to Frederick I of Denmark.

Frederik III had large parts of his daughters' trousseau bought in Paris, which, already at that time, was a centre for European fashion. But the jewellery was commissioned to Kurtz. He was, therefore, considered an outstanding jeweller. In 1670–1671 he made his principal piece of work, Crown of Christian V. The closed shape was inspired by the crown of Louis XIV of France, but Kurtz replaced the lily-shaped points of the French crown with palmettes and adorned the crown with a row of diamonds intertwined with palmette and acanthus. In that way a "white" play of light was created, which was framed by blue and red in the sapphires and garnets of the crown ring and the blue monde and cross in the top.

The crown forms part of the National Coat of arms of Denmark and the Royal Coat of arms. Since 1671, the crown has been the de facto symbol of the state power. It is included in stylized and varied forms in most state institutions, including ministries.
