= Coat of arms of Tallinn =

Coat of arms of Tallinn, Estonia

Versions
- Middle coat of arms of Tallinn

- Lesser coat of arms of Tallinn
- Armiger: Jevgeni Ossinovski, Mayor of Tallinn
- Adopted: 10 October 1996

Coat of arms of Tallinn represents Tallinn, the capital city of Estonia.

== Greater coat of arms ==
The full, or greater, coat of arms of Tallinn depicts three blue marching, forward-facing (passant gardant) lions crowned with golden crowns on a golden shield. The shield is topped with a silver helmet placed affronté, with closed visor and red lining. The mantling is blue and golden. A golden neck chain featuring a stone hangs around the helmet's neck. The helmet's crest features a golden crown from which a woman protrudes, clad in a red robe and wearing a golden crown, arms crossed before her chest.

== Lesser coat of arms ==
The lesser coat of arms of Tallinn features a silver cross on a red background, depicting the Dannebrog cross. It is also the coat of arms of Harju County.

== History ==
The coat of arms with the three lions is one of the oldest Estonian symbols. It has been used in Tallinn (former Hanseatic city of Reval) and adjacent northern Estonia since the 13th century. Its design originates from the coat of arms of King Valdemar II of Denmark, then ruler of northern Estonia.

The design of the flag of Tallinn, also in use since 1200s, has been based on the three blue lions of the coat of arms.

A later version of the same coat of arms of Tallinn, when it was part of the Russian Empire, was formally approved by Catherine II on 4 October 1788. The Law number 16716 "On the Coats of Arms of the Cities of the Riga, Reval and Vyborg Gubernias and the Olonets Provincial Cities" stipulated the description of the arms: "in a golden field azure leopard lions".

In 1868, under the direction of B.V. Koehne in the Armorial Department of the Heraldry Department of the Government of Senta, a draft of the Reval coat of arms was drawn up in accordance with the rules of external decorations: the shield should have been crowned with a golden-crowned crown; behind the shield probably (?) should be placed anchors, tied with Alexander's ribbon.

On 22 (10 OS) December 10 1877, the same day the newly formed Tallinn (Reval) city assembly gathered for the first time, it approved the large coat of arms of the city. December 22 is celebrated as the "Day of the City of Tallinn".

After Estonia became an independent country in 1918, the coat of arms of Tallinn was reconfirmed in 1919 in the same form as it had been approved in 1877. In this same form it can be seen on the painted bas-relief on the Tallinn Town Hall.

In the 1970s to 1980s, a Soviet-style emblem (analogous to coat of arms) was designed by Paul Luhtein. It was a red-blue shield with two transverse waves, on top of which was placed in the middle an image of a golden key with a 5-gang beard and "Old Thomas" in the head.

== Gallery ==
A seal of Tallinn (Hanseatic city of Reval), made in 1340

Flag of Tallinn, in use since 1200s, based on the three blue lions of the coat of arms

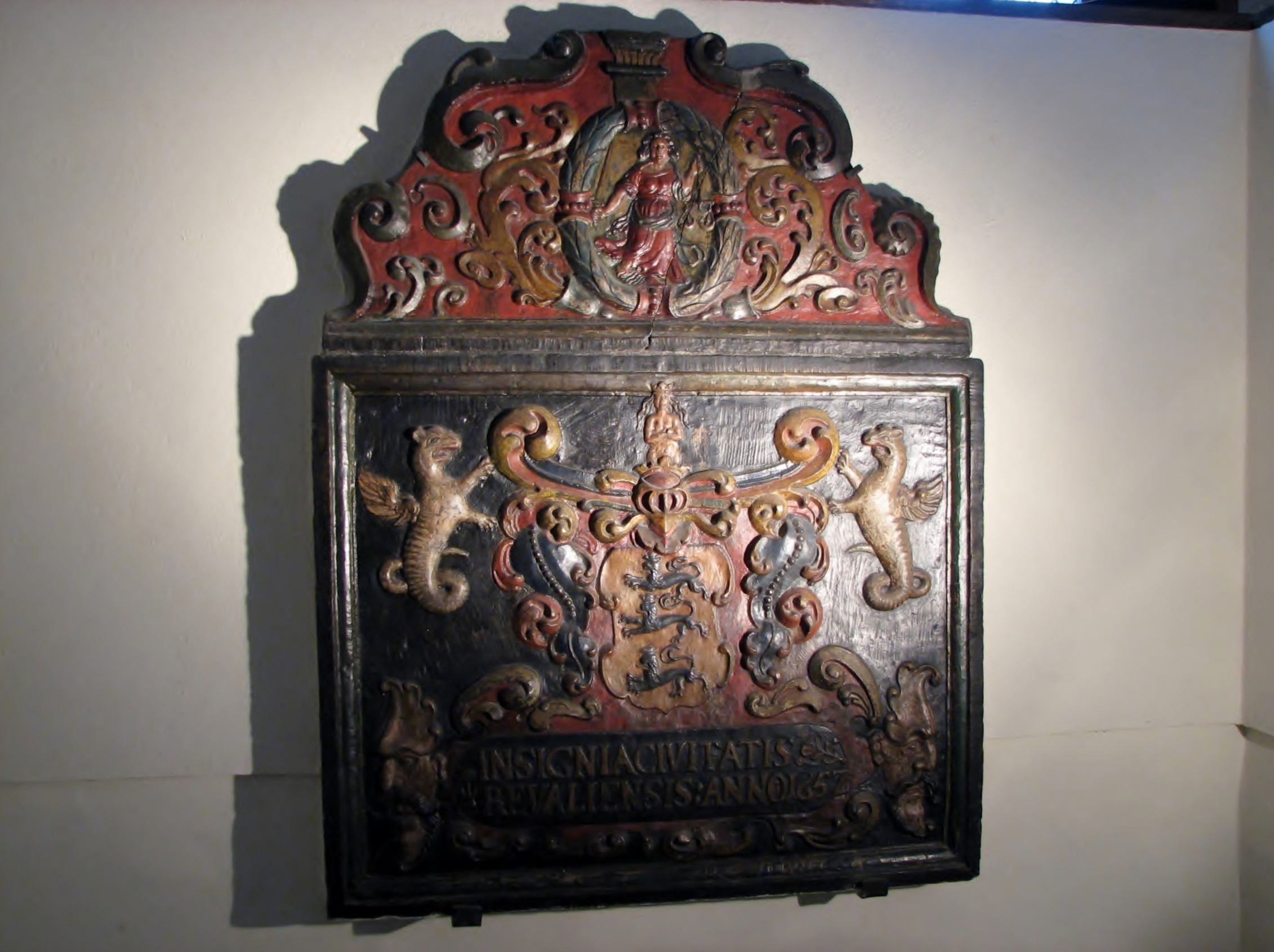
Relief of the greater coat of arms of Reval made in 1652

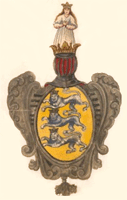
Greater coat of arms of Reval in 1730

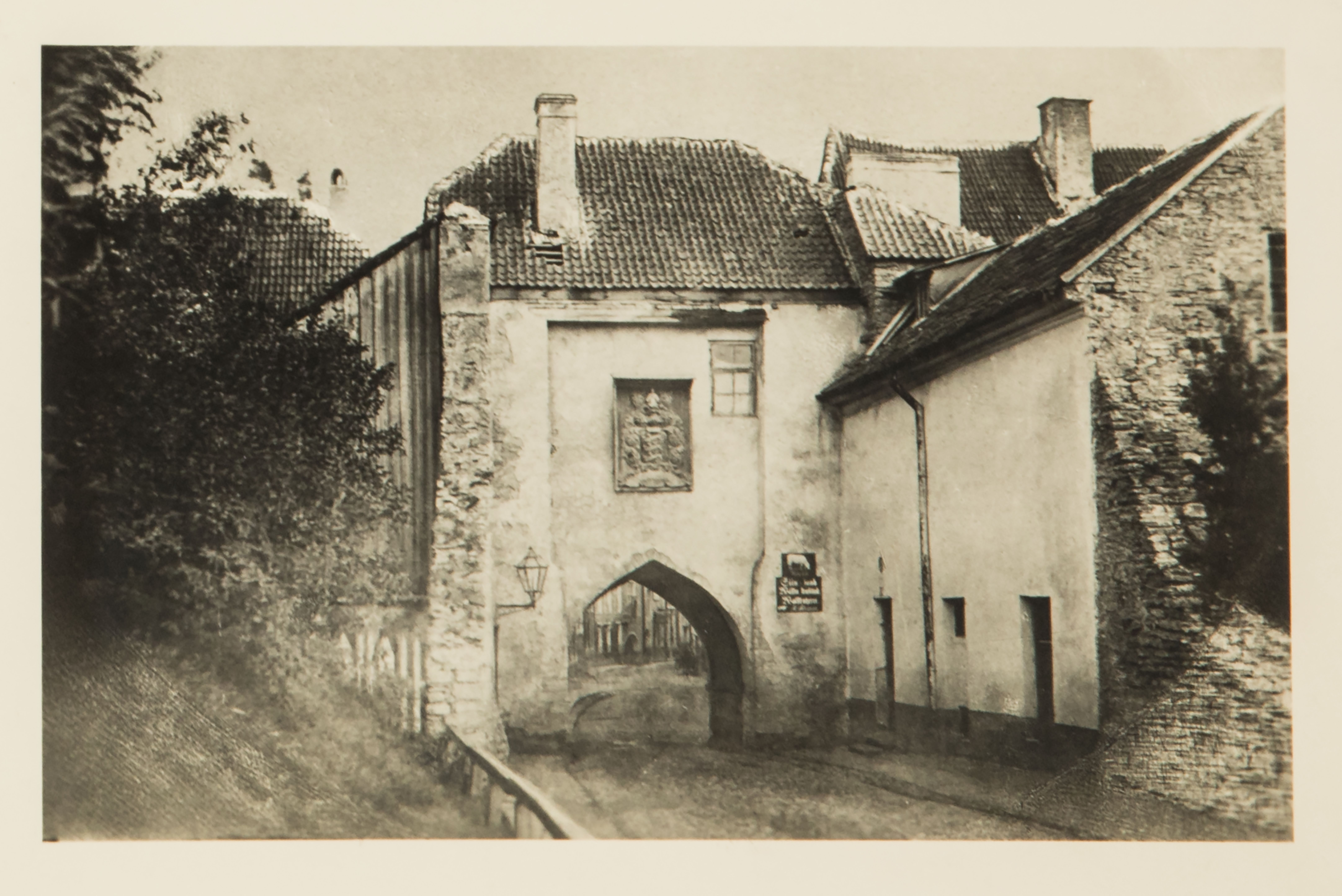
The full coat of arms on Harju Gate ca 1870

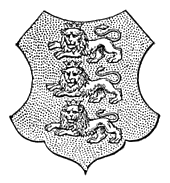
Middle coat of arms of Reval as documented in 1885

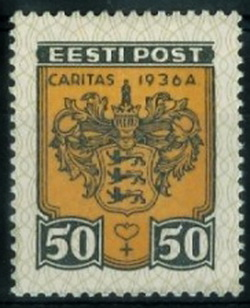
Greater coat of arms of Tallinn on a 1936 stamp

Soviet-style emblem of Tallinn

== See also ==
- Flag of Tallinn
- Coat of arms of Estonia

== Sources ==
- Tallinn sümboolika linna kodulehel (in Estonian)
- Tallinna sümboolika (suur vapp) (in Estonian)
- Tallinna sümboolika (väike vapp) (in Estonian)
- Taani lõvide salapärane tee Eesti vapile (in Estonian)
