= Coat of arms of Denmark =

National coat of arms

Greater coat of arms of Denmark
- Greater (royal) version

Versions
- Middle version

- Lesser (state) version
- Armiger: Frederik X, King of the Danish Realm (greater version); Government of Denmark (lesser (state) version)
- Adopted: First documented in the 1190s. Designated as dynastic arms 1959. Last modified 20 December 2024.
- Crest: Crown of King Christian V
- Torse: tasseled strings Or
- Shield: A shield quartered by a cross pattée argent bordured gules, first quarter Or, three lions passant in pale azure crowned and armed Or langued gules, nine lily pads gules (for Denmark); second quarter azure, a ram passant argent armed and unguled Or (for the Faroe Islands); third quarter azure, a polar bear rampant argent (for Greenland); fourth quarter Or, two lions passant in pale azure armed Or langued gules (for Schleswig). Overall an escutcheon Or two bars gules (for Oldenburg)
- Supporters: two wild men armed with clubs Proper
- Compartment: pedestal
- Motto: Latin: Magnanimi Pretium
- Order(s): Order of the Dannebrog, and Order of the Elephant
- Other elements: The monarch places this coat of arms on a mantle gules lined with Ermine. Above the mantle is a pavilion gules again topped with the royal crown.

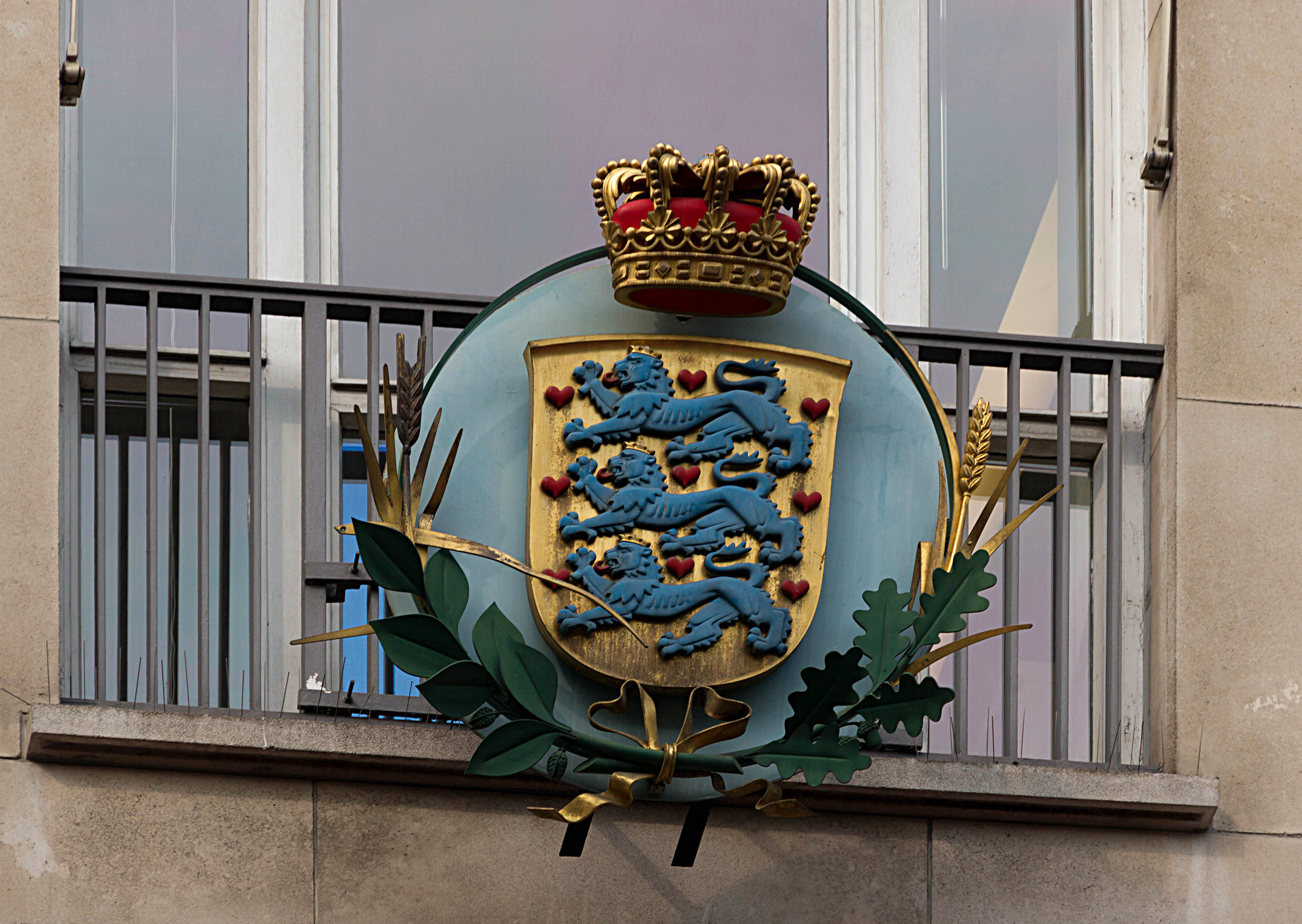
Relief of the coat of arms at the Danish House in Paris

The coat of arms of the Danish Realm (Danish: Danmarks rigsvåben) has a lesser and a greater version.

The state coat of arms of Denmark (rigsvåben) consists of three pale blue lions passant wearing crowns, accompanied by nine red lilypads (normally represented as heraldic hearts), all in a golden shield with the royal crown on top.

The national coat of arms of Denmark (nationalvåben, also called lille våben) is similar to the state coat of arms, but without the royal crown above the shield.

It is evolved from the coat of arms of the House of Estridsen, the dynasty which provided the kings of Denmark between 1047 and 1412. Historically, there had been no distinction between the "national" and the "royal" coat of arms. Since 1819, there has been a more complex royal coat of arms of Denmark (kongevåben) separate from the national coat of arms (rigsvåben). The current design was introduced in 2024, under Frederik X.

== History ==
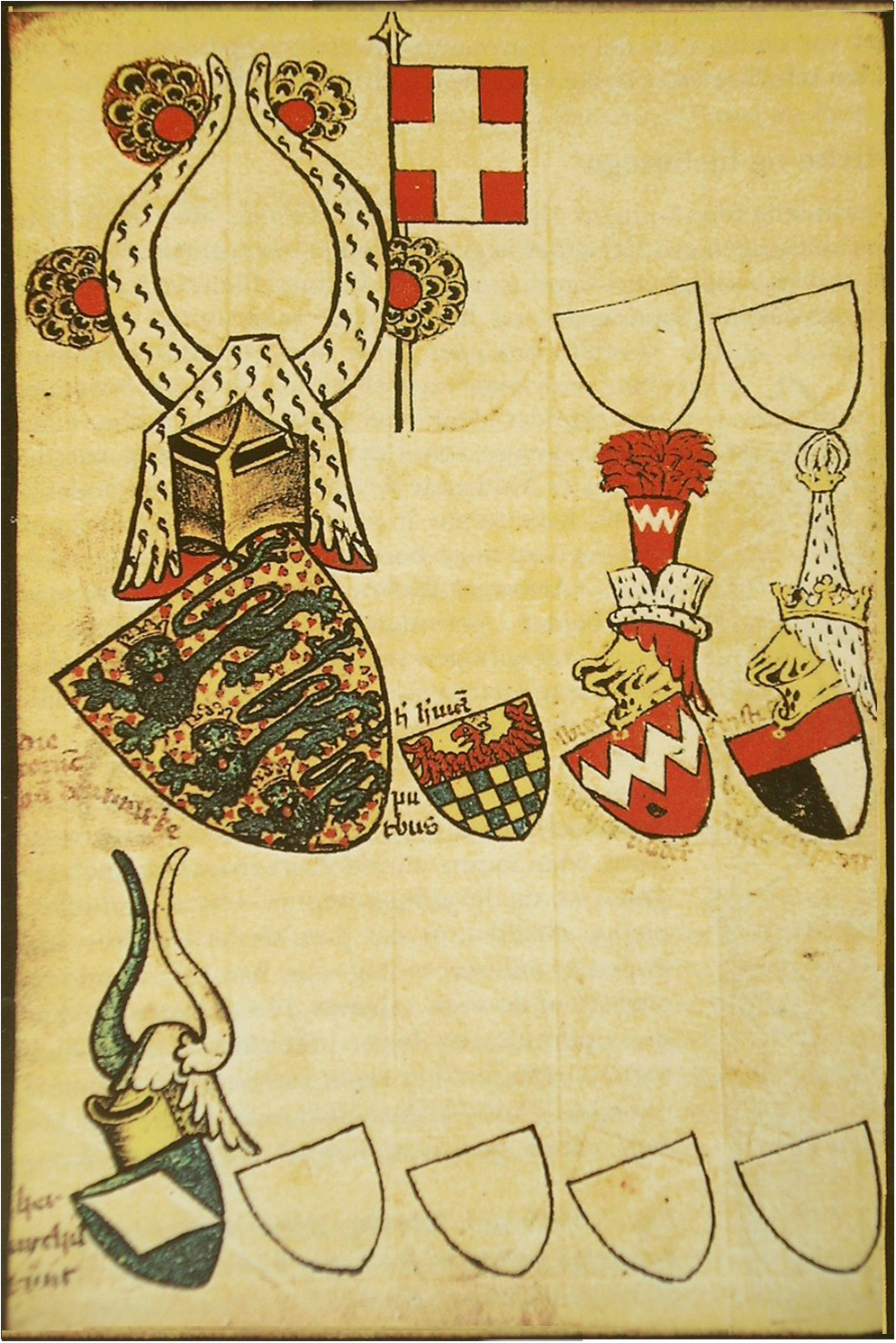
The Danish coat of arms in the Gelre Armorial, 14th century. This is the oldest coloured image of the Dannebrog. The crest was used by Danish monarchs from the 13th century until c. 1420. The flag is not part of the crest.

The oldest known depiction of the insignia dates from a seal used by King Canute VI c. 1194. The oldest documentation for the colours dates from c. 1270.

Historically, the lions faced the viewer and the number of hearts was not regulated and could be much higher. The "heart" shapes originally represented waterlily pads; a royal decree of 1972 still specifies these figures as søblade ("lake leaves").

The current design was traced to 1819 during the reign of King Frederick VI who fixed the number of hearts to nine and decreed that the heraldic beasts were lions, consequently facing forward. A rare version exists from the reign of king Erik of Pomerania in which the three lions jointly hold the Danish banner, in a similar fashion as in the coat of arms of the former South Jutland County. Until c. 1960, Denmark used both a "small" and a "large" coat of arms, similar to the system still used in Sweden. The latter symbol held wide use within the government administration, e.g., by the Foreign Ministry. Since this time, the latter symbol has been classified as the coat of arms of the royal family, leaving Denmark with only one national coat of arms, used for all official purposes.

The crown on the shield is a heraldic construction based on the crown of King Christian V, not to be confused with the crown of King Christian IV. The main difference from the real crown is that the latter is covered with table cut (taffelsten) diamonds rather than pearls. Both crowns, and other royal insignia, are located in Rosenborg Castle in Copenhagen.

The blazon in heraldic terms is: Or, three lions passant in pale azure crowned and armed Or langued gules, nine hearts Gules.

This insignia is almost identical to the coat of arms of Estonia and the greater coat of arms of Tallinn which can both be traced directly back to King Valdemar II and the Danish rule in northern Estonia in 1219–1346. The main differences are as follows: In the Danish coat of arms the lions are crowned, face forward, and accompanied by nine hearts. In the Estonian coat of arms, the "leopards" still face the viewer, they are not crowned, and no hearts are present. The coat of arms of Tallinn resembles the Estonian arms, but the leopards in the former arms are crowned with golden crowns similar to the ones in the Danish arms. It shows great similarities with the contemporary insignia of England's Richard the Lionheart and the current arms of the German state of Baden-Württemberg. The Danish coat of arms has also been the inspiration for the coat of arms of the former Duchy of Schleswig, a former Danish province (two blue lions in a golden shield). The hearts of the coat of arms also appear in the coat of arms of the German district of Lüneburg.

The current iteration of the royal coat of arms was adopted on December 20, 2024.

== Royal coat of arms ==
The royal coat of arms is more complex. The current version was established by royal decree on 20 December 2024. It is much simpler than previous versions.

The shield is quartered by a silver cross bordured in red. The first quarter represents Denmark with three crowned lions passant accompanied by nine hearts, the second quarter represents the Faroe Islands with a silver ram on blue, the third quarter represents Greenland with a silver polar bear on blue, and the fourth quarter contains two lions passant representing Southern Jutland, the northern part of former Schleswig.

The centre escutcheon, two red bars on a golden shield, represents the House of Oldenburg, the former royal dynasty that ruled Denmark and Norway from the middle of the fifteenth century. When the senior branch of this dynasty became extinct in 1863, the crown passed to Prince Christian of the cadet branch Glücksburg, whose descendants have reigned in Denmark ever since. The House of Glücksburg continues the use of the arms of the old Oldenburg dynasty, and the symbol is still officially referred to by its old association.

Two woodwoses (vildmænd) act as supporters; this element can be traced back to the early reign of the Oldenburg dynasty. Similar supporters were used in the former arms of Prussia. The shield features the insignias of the Order of the Dannebrog and the Order of the Elephant around it.

The shield and supporters are framed by a royal ermine robe, surmounted by a royal crown.

The royal coat of arms has since around 1960 been reserved exclusively for use by the monarch, the royal family, the Royal Guards and the royal court according to royal decree. A select number of purveyors to the Danish royal family are also allowed to use the royal insignia.

=== Historical versions ===
In late medieval heraldry, coats of arms that used to be associated with noble families became attached to the territories that had been ruled by these families, and coats of arms used by individual rulers were composed of the coats of arms of the territories they ruled. In the case of Denmark, the coat of arms of the House of Estridsen with the extinction of the dynasty became the "coat of arms of Denmark". Olaf II of Denmark (and IV of Norway) succeeded his maternal grandfather Valdemar IV in 1376. He was the first king to rule Norway and Denmark in personal union. Olaf on his seal still displayed the Estridsen (for Denmark) and Sverre (for Norway) coats of arms in two separate shields. The custom of dividing the field arises with Erik of Pomerania at the end of the 14th century.

The modern "royal coat of arms of Denmark" is the continuation of this tradition of the Danish monarch using his or her personal coat of arms after the end of the personal union of Denmark and Norway.

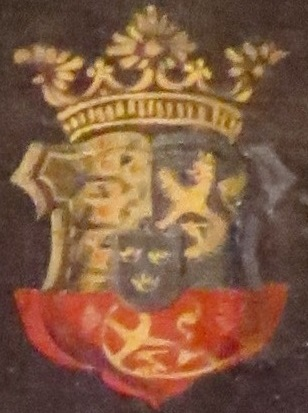
| Coat of arms | Bearer | Description |
|---|---|---|
| | King Valdemar IV | Coat of arms of Valdemar IV of Denmark. |
| | Queen Margaret I | The Arms of Margaret I of Denmark with the heraldry of Denmark (left field), Sweden (right field, represented by the Arms of House of Bjälbo) and Norway (escutcheon) with 3 crowns in the center. |
| | King Eric VII | Coat of arms of King Eric VII of Denmark and III of Norway (ruled in personal union, 1396–1439). The colour of the cross over all, here shown in red, is unattested; Christian I has a silver cross (or cross potent) superimposed on the red cross, later designs seem to favour gold. |
| | King Christopher III | Coat of arms of Christopher III |
| | King Christian I | Coat of arms of Christian I, John I, and Christian II; introduces the arms of the House of Oldenburg as inescutcheon. |
| | King John I | Coat of arms of Christian I, John I, and Christian II; introduces the arms of the House of Oldenburg as inescutcheon. |
| | King Christian II | Coat of arms of Christian I, John I, and Christian II; introduces the arms of the House of Oldenburg as inescutcheon. |
| | King Frederick I | Coat of arms of Frederick I |
| | King Christian III | Coat of arms of Christian III |
| | King Frederick II | Arms of Denmark and Norway used 1559–1699 |
| | King Christian IV | Arms of Denmark and Norway used 1559–1699 |
| | King Frederick III | Arms of Denmark and Norway used 1559–1699 |
| | King Christian V | Arms of Denmark and Norway used 1559–1699 |
| | King Frederick IV | Greater coat of arms of Denmark and Norway used during 1699–1819 |
| | King Christian VI | Greater coat of arms of Denmark and Norway used during 1699–1819 |
| | King Frederick V | Greater coat of arms of Denmark and Norway used during 1699–1819 |
| | King Christian VII | Greater coat of arms of Denmark and Norway used during 1699–1819 |
| | King Frederick VI | Greater coat of arms of Denmark used from 1819 to 1903. This was the first Danish arms following the replacement of the Norwegian lion with the coat of arms of the three former parts of Norway that Denmark retained after 1814: the stockfish of Iceland, the ram of Faroe Islands, and the polar bear of Greenland. |
| | King Christian VIII | Greater coat of arms of Denmark used from 1819 to 1903. This was the first Danish arms following the replacement of the Norwegian lion with the coat of arms of the three former parts of Norway that Denmark retained after 1814: the stockfish of Iceland, the ram of Faroe Islands, and the polar bear of Greenland. |
| | King Frederick VII | Greater coat of arms of Denmark used from 1819 to 1903. This was the first Danish arms following the replacement of the Norwegian lion with the coat of arms of the three former parts of Norway that Denmark retained after 1814: the stockfish of Iceland, the ram of Faroe Islands, and the polar bear of Greenland. |
| | King Christian IX | Greater coat of arms of Denmark used from 1819 to 1903. This was the first Danish arms following the replacement of the Norwegian lion with the coat of arms of the three former parts of Norway that Denmark retained after 1814: the stockfish of Iceland, the ram of Faroe Islands, and the polar bear of Greenland. |
| | King Christian IX | Greater coat of arms of Denmark. This version was used from 1903 to 1948. This was the only version of the Danish arms in which Iceland was represented by a falcon rather than its traditional stockfish arms. |
| | King Frederik VIII | Greater coat of arms of Denmark. This version was used from 1903 to 1948. This was the only version of the Danish arms in which Iceland was represented by a falcon rather than its traditional stockfish arms. |
| | King Christian X | Greater coat of arms of Denmark. This version was used from 1903 to 1948. This was the only version of the Danish arms in which Iceland was represented by a falcon rather than its traditional stockfish arms. |
| | King Frederik IX | Greater coat of arms of Denmark. This version was used from 1948 to 1972. The falcon of Iceland was removed belatedly after the independence of Iceland from Denmark in 1944. The change was implemented after the death of king Christian X, who used the style "king of Denmark and Iceland" until his death. In 1959, the "three-lions" insignia became the sole national coat of arms, and the previous "greater coat of arms" was designated as the coat of arms of the Danish royal family. |
| | Queen Margrethe II | Version used from 1972 until 2024. The shield is quartered by a silver cross fimbriated in red, derived from the Danish flag, the Dannebrog. The first and fourth quarters represent Denmark by three crowned lions passant accompanied by nine hearts; the second quarter contains two lions passant representing Southern Jutland, the northern part of former Schleswig; the third quarter contains a total of three symbols. The Three Crowns are officially interpreted as a symbol of the former Kalmar Union. The silver ram on blue represents the Faroe Islands and the similarly coloured polar bear represents Greenland. The centre escutcheon, two red bars on a golden shield, represents the House of Oldenburg, the former royal dynasty that ruled Denmark and Norway from the middle of the fifteenth century. When the senior branch of this dynasty became extinct in 1863, the crown passed to Prince Christian of the cadet branch Glücksburg, whose descendants have reigned in Denmark ever since. The House of Glücksburg continues the use of the arms of the old Oldenburg dynasty, and the symbol is still officially referred to by its old association. |
| | King Frederik X | Present version used since 2024. |

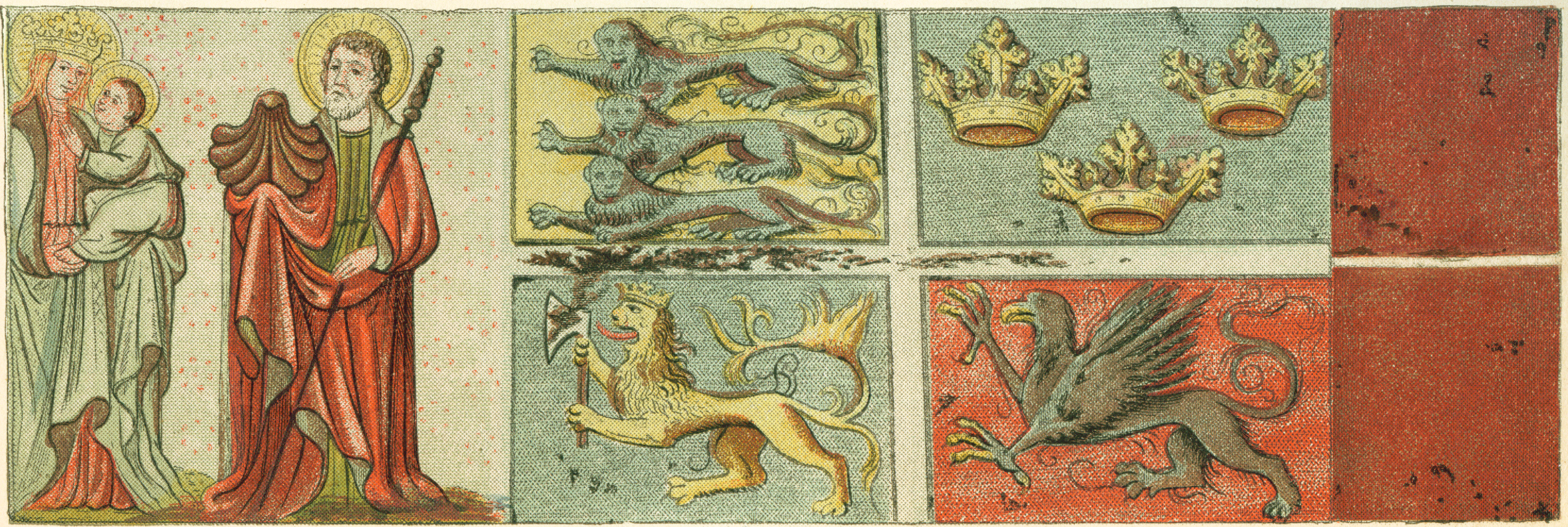
A medieval ship flag captured by forces from Lübeck in the 1420s showing the arms of Denmark, Sweden, Norway and Pomerania. The original flag was destroyed in World War II during a British attack on the city, but a 19th-century copy remains in Frederiksborg Palace, Denmark. The saint accompanying the Virgin Mary and infant Christ is Saint James the Greater, identified by his scallop shell emblem.

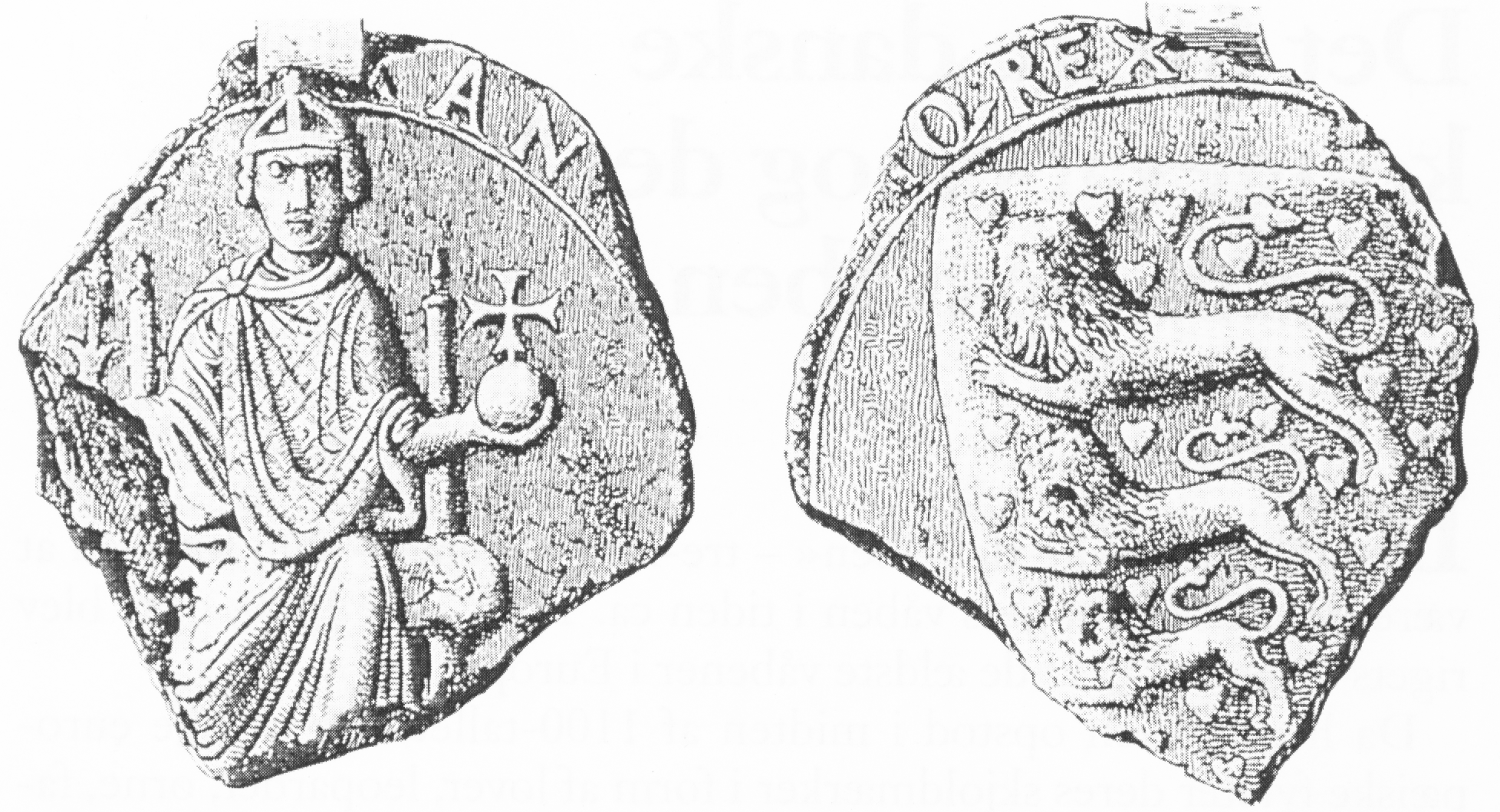
The earliest known example of the Danish coat of arms, the seal of Canute VI, 1190s. The only known copy of this insignia was discovered in 1879 in the Grand Ducal archive of Mecklenburg-Schwerin, Germany. Note the king's closed crown which differs from the open crowns shown on the seals of his successors, and the shield that is semé of hearts rather than showing only nine.

Throughout the 20th century the version of the arms became simplified from the previous versions, which contained seven additional sub-coats representing five territories formerly ruled by the Danish kings and two medieval titles: Holstein, Stormarn, Dithmarschen, Lauenburg, Delmenhorst, and King of the Wends and Goths. A crowned silver stockfish on red was formerly included to represent Iceland, but due to Icelandic opposition, this symbol was replaced in 1903 by a silver falcon on blue. The falcon was in turn removed from the royal arms in 1948 following the death of King Christian X in 1947 and reflecting the 1944 breakup of the Dano-Icelandic union.

The following list is based on research by Danish heraldist Erling Svane. Danish names are shown in brackets.

- Norway (Norge): 1398 – c. 1819: Gules, a lion rampant crowned and bearing an axe Or bladed argent. The union with Norway was dissolved in 1814 as a result of the Napoleonic Wars.
- Sweden (Sverige): 1398 - Azure, three bars argent surmounted by a lion rampant Or. The Folkung lion, the arms of Sweden until 1364. Only used during the reign of Erik of Pomerania.
- Pomerania (Pommern): 1398 - Argent, a griffin segreant gules. Only used during the reign of Erik of Pomerania.
- Bavaria (Bayern / archaic: Bajern): 1440 - Lozengy argent and azure. Only used during the reign of Christopher of Bavaria.
- Palatinate (Pfalz): 1440 - Sable, a lion rampant crowned Or. Only used during the reign of Christopher of Bavaria.
- King of the Wends (de venders konge / Vendernes Konge): 1440–1972: Gules, a lindorm crowned Or. Early examples of this insignia also exist with a blue shield. Canute VI proclaimed himself Rex Sclavorum (King of Slavs). From the reign of Valdemar IV this title was known as King of the Wends. This symbol was later also interpreted as the coat of arms of Funen and appeared in the official insignia of the now-defunct army regiment Fynske Livregiment. It should not be confused with the similar insignia of Bornholm, also formerly included in the Danish arms.
- King of the Goths (de gothers konge / Gothernes Konge): 1449–1972: Or, nine hearts 4, 3 and 2 Gules, in chief a lion passant Azure. Derived from the arms of Denmark and originally the arms of the Dukes of Halland. The lion is almost never crowned. This symbol was later also interpreted as the coat of arms of Jutland. It appears on the stern of the 19th century frigate Jylland and in the official insignia of the army regiment Jydske Dragonregiment.
- Holstein (Holsten): 1440–1972: Gules, a nettle leaf between three passion nails in pairle argent. Derived from the coat of arms of the counts of Schauenburg; a silver shield with a red indented bordure.
- Stormarn: 1496–1972: Gules, a swan argent gorged of a crown Or.
- Delmenhorst: 1531–1972: Azure, a cross pattée Or.
- Dithmarschen (Ditmarsken): 1563 - Gules, a knight armed cap-à-pie Or mounted on a horse argent and bearing a shield azure charged with a cross pattée Or. Frederick II conquered Dithmarschen in 1559.
- Iceland (Island): 16th century – 1903: Gules, a stockfish argent ensigned by a crown Or. The symbol had been associated with Iceland from the early 16th century. First included in the arms of Frederick II. From 1903 to 1948 different arms were used, viz. Azure, a falcon argent. Iceland dissolved the union with Denmark in 1944, and following the death of King Christian X in 1947, the new King Frederik IX decided to remove the falcon from his arms. This change took place by royal decree on 6 July 1948.
- Gotland (archaic: Gulland): Gules, a Holy Lamb argent. First included by King Frederick II. Last used during the reign of King Frederick VI.
- Saaremaa (Øsel): from 1603, last used by King Frederick VI: Azure, an eagle displayed sable. Several historians have explained this violation of the heraldic rule of tincture as the black colour being the result of an oxidation of white paint containing lead.
- Fehmarn (Femern): from 1666, last used by King Frederick VI: Azure, a crown Or.
- Bornholm: from c. 1665, last used by King Frederick VI: Gules, a dragon Or.
- Lauenburg (Lauenborg): 1819–1972: Gules, a horse's head couped argent. Derived from the German Sachsenross arms which shows a silver horse on red.

=== 21st century update ===
On 20 December 2024, Frederik X changed the royal arms, which were last adjusted by his mother in 1972. In the current version Greenland and the Faroe Islands have been given more space in the new royal arms, which are the King's personal arms and a state emblem.

The change reflects the King's wishes to create a contemporary royal arms that both reflects the Danish Realm and takes into account history and heraldic tradition. Previously, the Faroe Islands and Greenland divided the same field out of four in the royal arms, where they have now each received their own field out of the four fields in the middle of the arms.

Notwithstanding the above, as in the royal arms from 1972, the Schleswig lions, the coat of arms of South Jutland, also have their own field in the arms. The two lions are carried as a special testimony to the history of South Jutland and date from the mid-13th century.

In connection with the change of the royal coat of arms, the Royal House has also decided to change the royal flags, so that the new royal coat of arms is now included in a number of the flags that the Royal House flies. The Royal Flag has the new coat of arms in the middle of the flag, while the Queen's flag has both the Queen's coat of arms and the King's new coat of arms. Crown Prince Christian also has a new flag, with the royal coat of arms in the middle of the flag crowned with the Crown Prince's Crown. The new royal flags have been flown from 1 January 2025 at Amalienborg, over the palaces of Frederik VIII and Christian VII.

The three crowns present for 500 years, symbolising the Kalmar Union between Denmark, Norway and Sweden, which lasted from 1397 to 1523, were removed in the 2024 update. The emphasis on Greenland and the Faroes was thought to be a rebuke to the returning American president Donald Trump and his proposals for the United States to purchase Greenland to increase its security.

==== Artwork ====
Royal coat of arms painter Ronny Skov Andersen has designed and drawn the new version of the royal coat of arms. He has also been chairman of the committee that was appointed shortly after the accession to the throne on 14 January with the aim of ensuring that the King would have a new coat of arms. In addition, the committee consisted of a royal historiographer of orders, a heraldic consultant, a museum director and three others.

== Versions and variants ==
=== Government ===
Various versions of the Danish Royal Arms are used by the Kingdom: Government, the Parliament and courts. The Kingdom Government and its agencies generally use a simplified version of the Royal Arms without the mantle, the pavilion and the topped royal crown. This simplified Royal Arms also feature on the cover of passports, embassies and consulates of the Kingdom of Denmark.

The version used by the government of Denmark

Arms of the Royal Danish Army

Aviator badge of the Royal Danish Air Force

=== Other members of the royal family ===
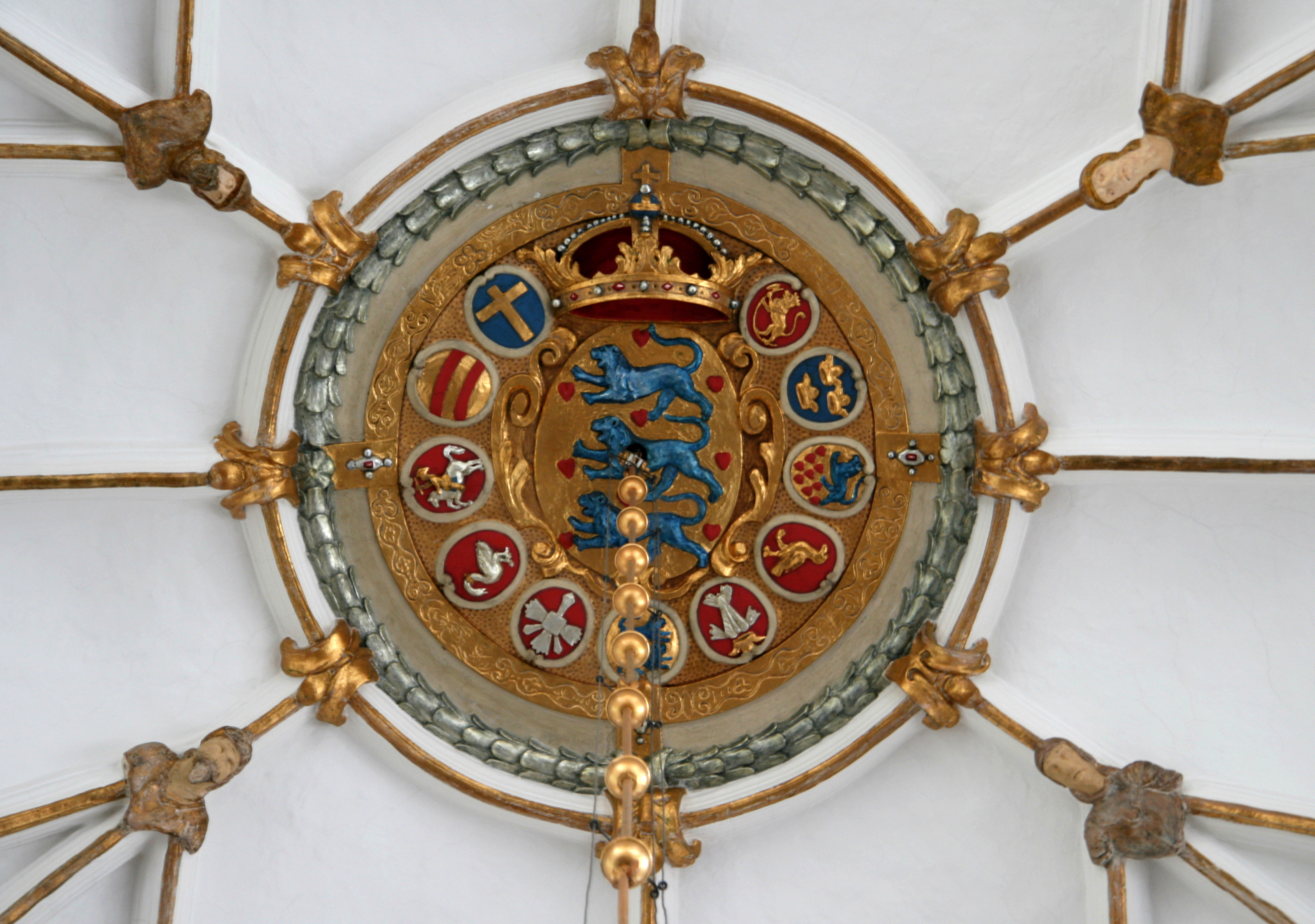
Coat of arms from Trinity Church, Copenhagen

| Coat of arms | Bearer | Description |
|---|---|---|
| | Queen Mary | Queen Mary's coat of arms is composed of the shield of arms of her husband impaled with her own, granted to her in 2004. The main field of Mary's coat of arms is Or-coloured and shows a MacDonald Gules eagle and a Sable-coloured boat both symbolising her Scottish ancestry. The Chief is Azure-coloured and shows two gold Commonwealth Stars from the arms of Australia, and a gold rose in between, depicting her personal symbol. The shield is surmounted by the Royal Crown of Denmark. |
| | Crown Prince Christian | Crown Prince Christian's coat of arms is similar to the royal coat of arms except for the heir apparent's crown and the purple mantle. |
| | Prince Joachim | Prince Joachim's coat of arms is similar to the 1972-2024 version of the royal coat of arms except the inescutcheon, which is divided with the first being that of the House of Oldenburg and second being that of the House of de Laborde de Monpezat. The crown is that of a Prince of Denmark. |
| | Princess Marie | Princess Marie's coat of arms is composed of the shield of arms of her husband impaled with her own, granted to her in 2010. A horseman, representing her maiden name Cavallier (meaning knight or horseman) is depicted Azure. The secondary charge is a combination of the Danish and French national symbols; a heart and a fleur de lys. Three red hearts (symbolising Denmark) are cut with the fleur de lys (symbolising France). |

== Gallery ==
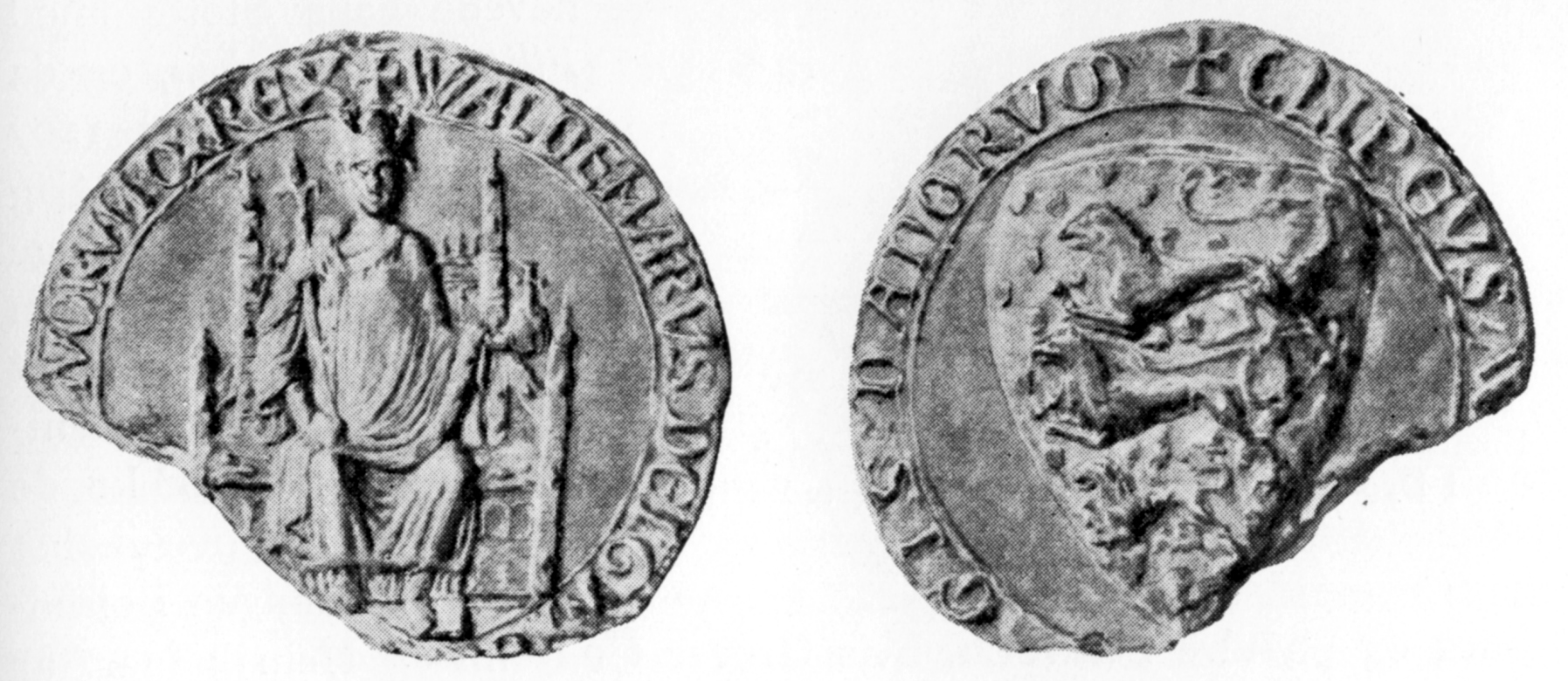
Seal of Valdemar II the Victorious (reigned 1202–41)

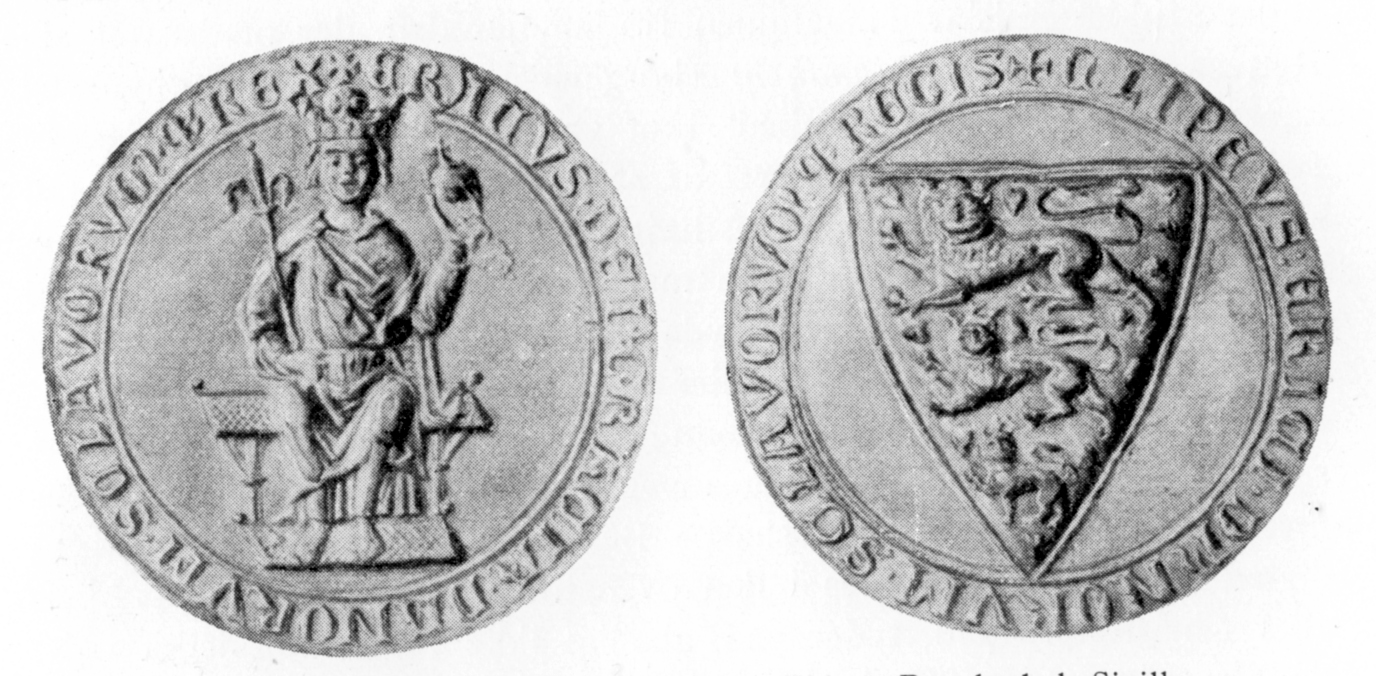
Seal of Eric V Klipping (reigned 1259–86)

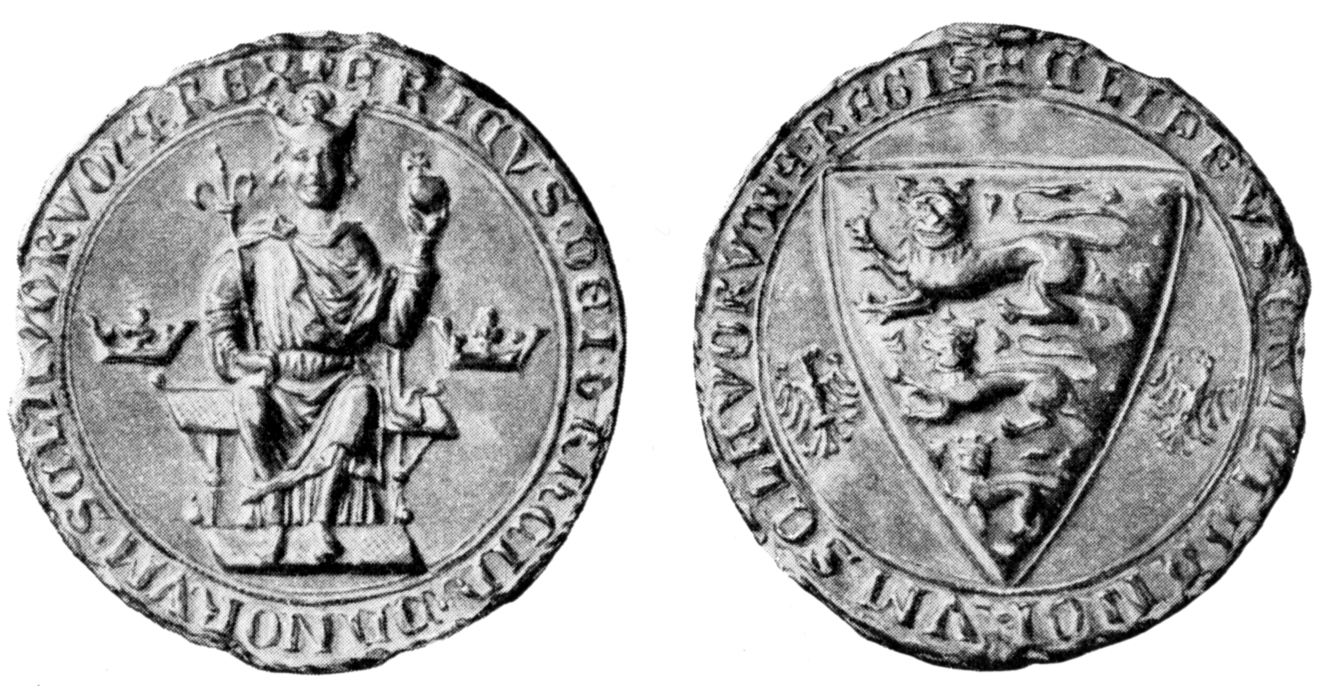
Seal of Eric VI Menved (reigned 1286–1319). The two eagles are references to his mother, Agnes of Brandenburg.

Royal standard of Denmark, c.1300

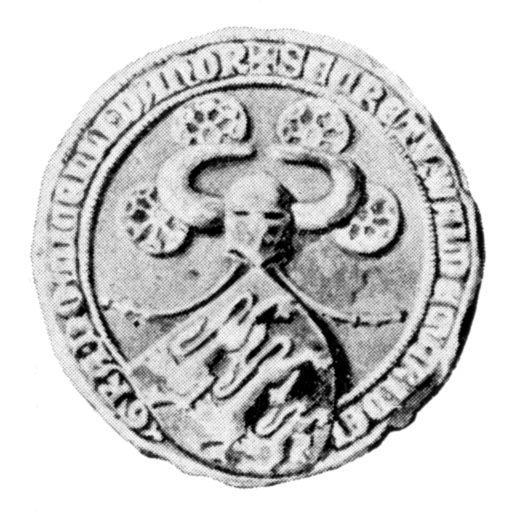
Seal of Valdemar IV Atterdag (reigned 1340–75), early 1340s

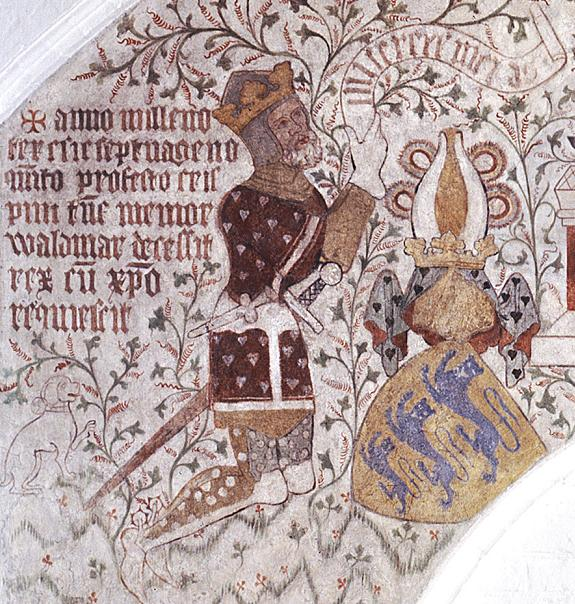
Fresco of Valdemar IV Atterdag as king. Notice the crest on the Danish coat of arms, Saint Peter's Church, Næstved.

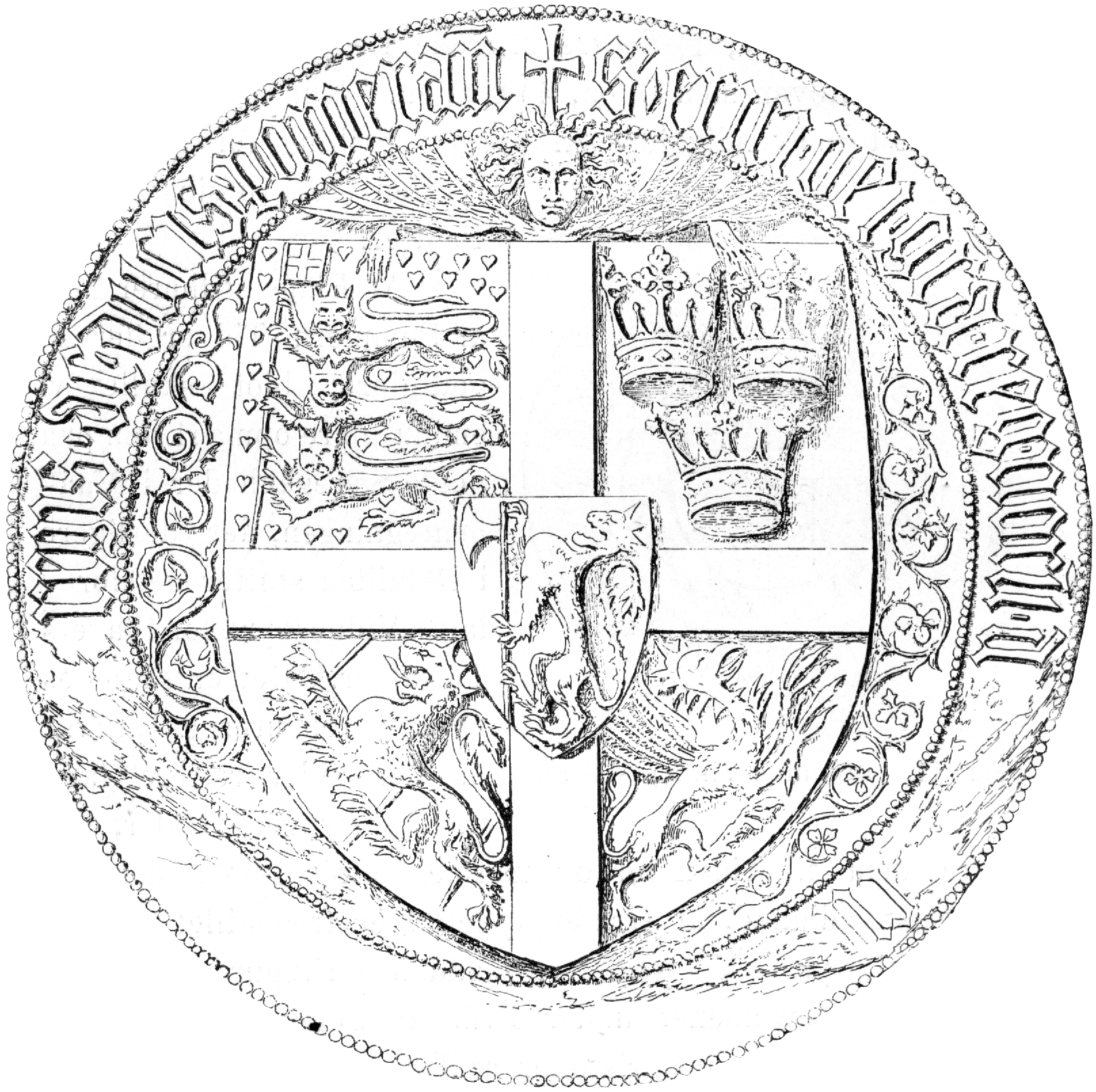
One of the seals of Eric VII "of Pomerania", 1398. The three Danish lions carry a Danish flag (top-left corner).

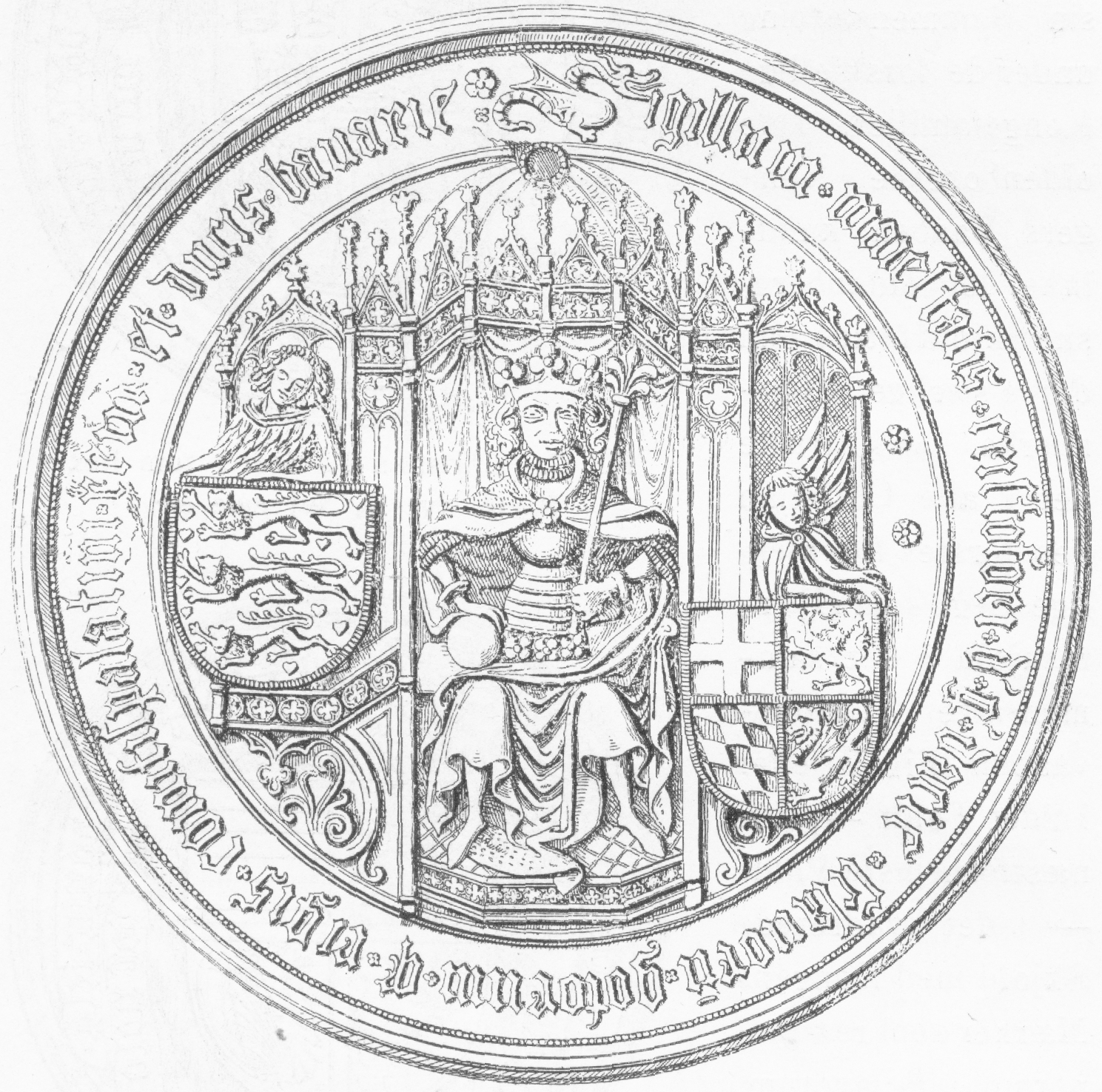
Seal of Christopher III "of Bavaria", 1440s

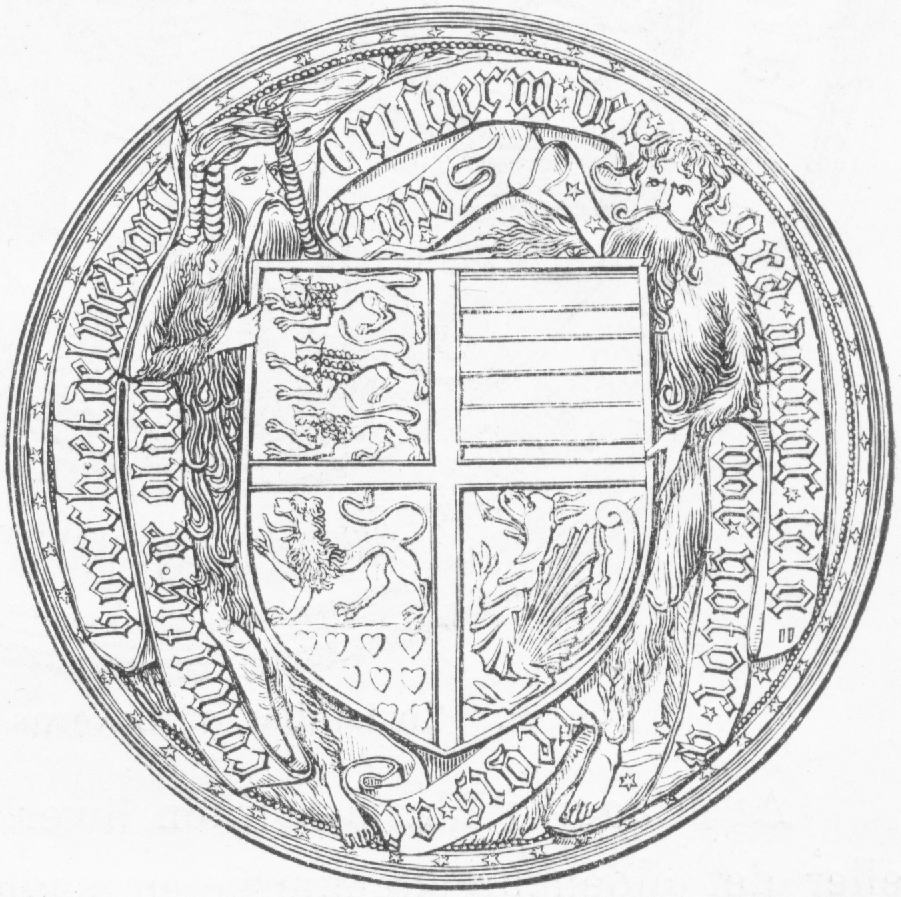
Sigilum secretum of Christian I, 1449

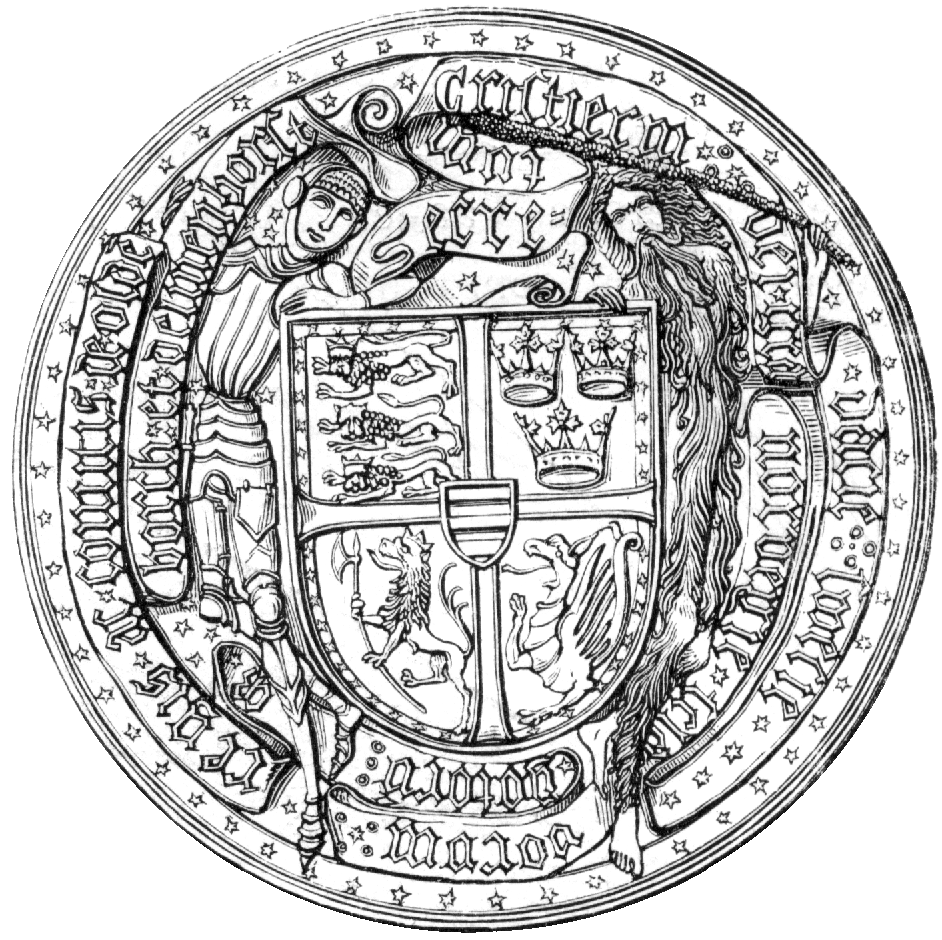
Sigilum secretum of Christian I, 1457–60

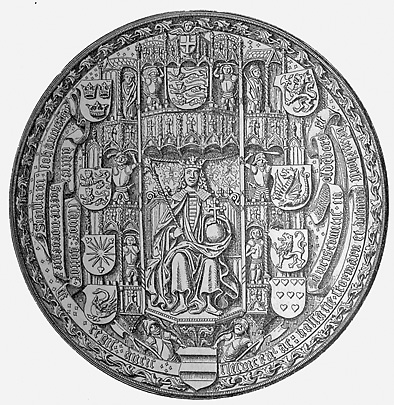
Seal of King Hans (reigned 1481–1513)

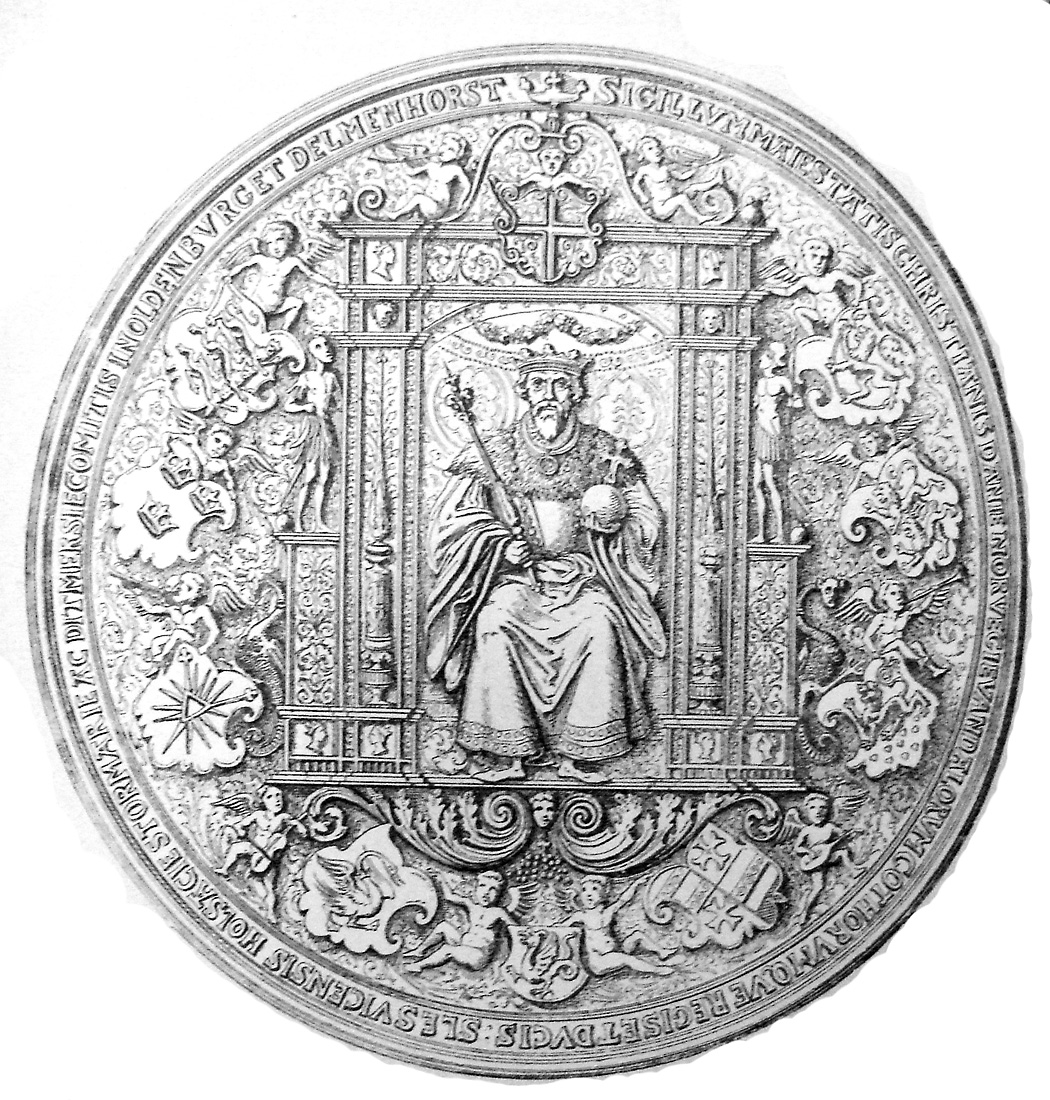
Seal of Christian III (reigned 1534–59)

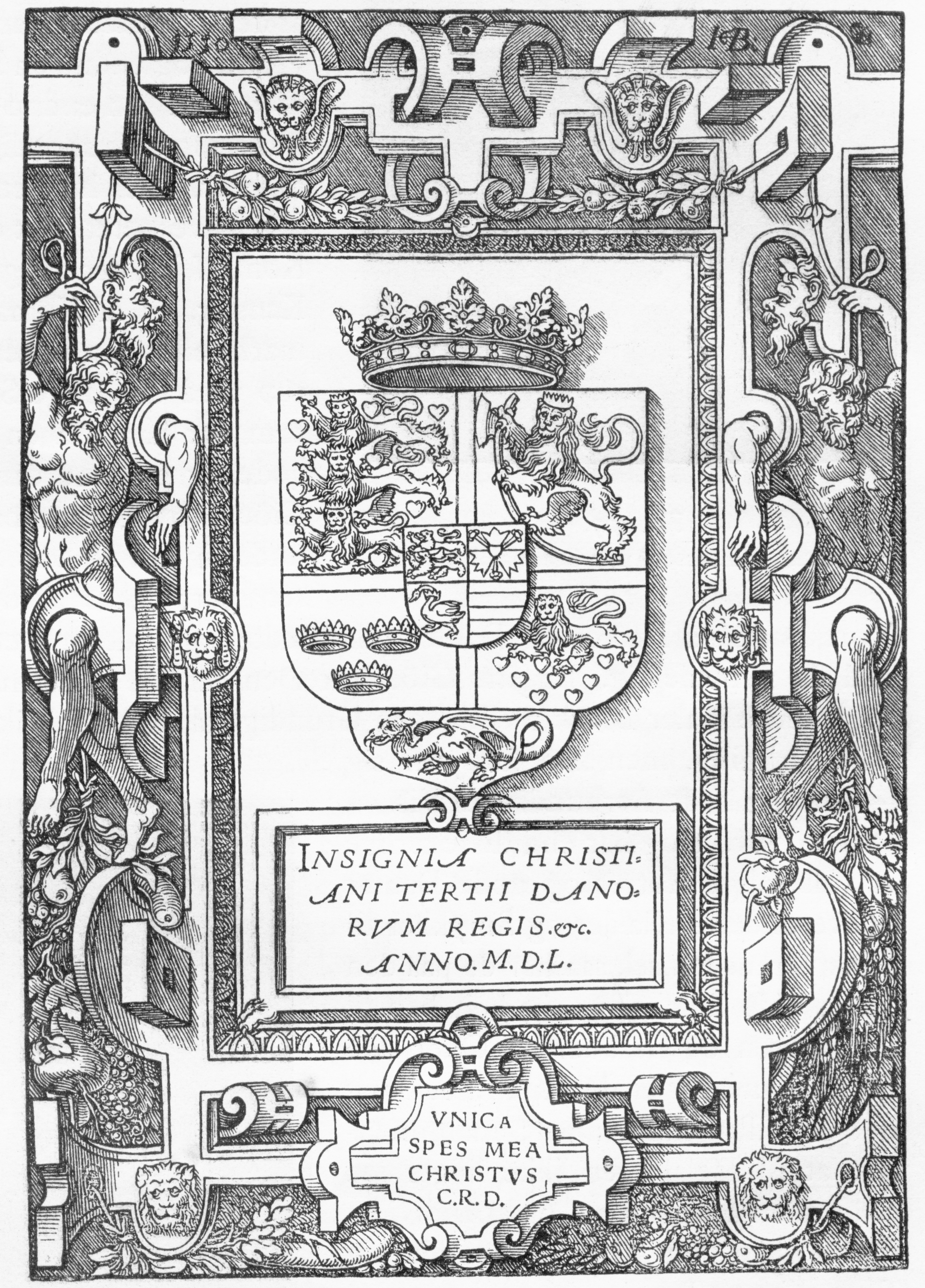
Coat of arms of Christian III as it appeared in the first Danish-language Bible, 1550

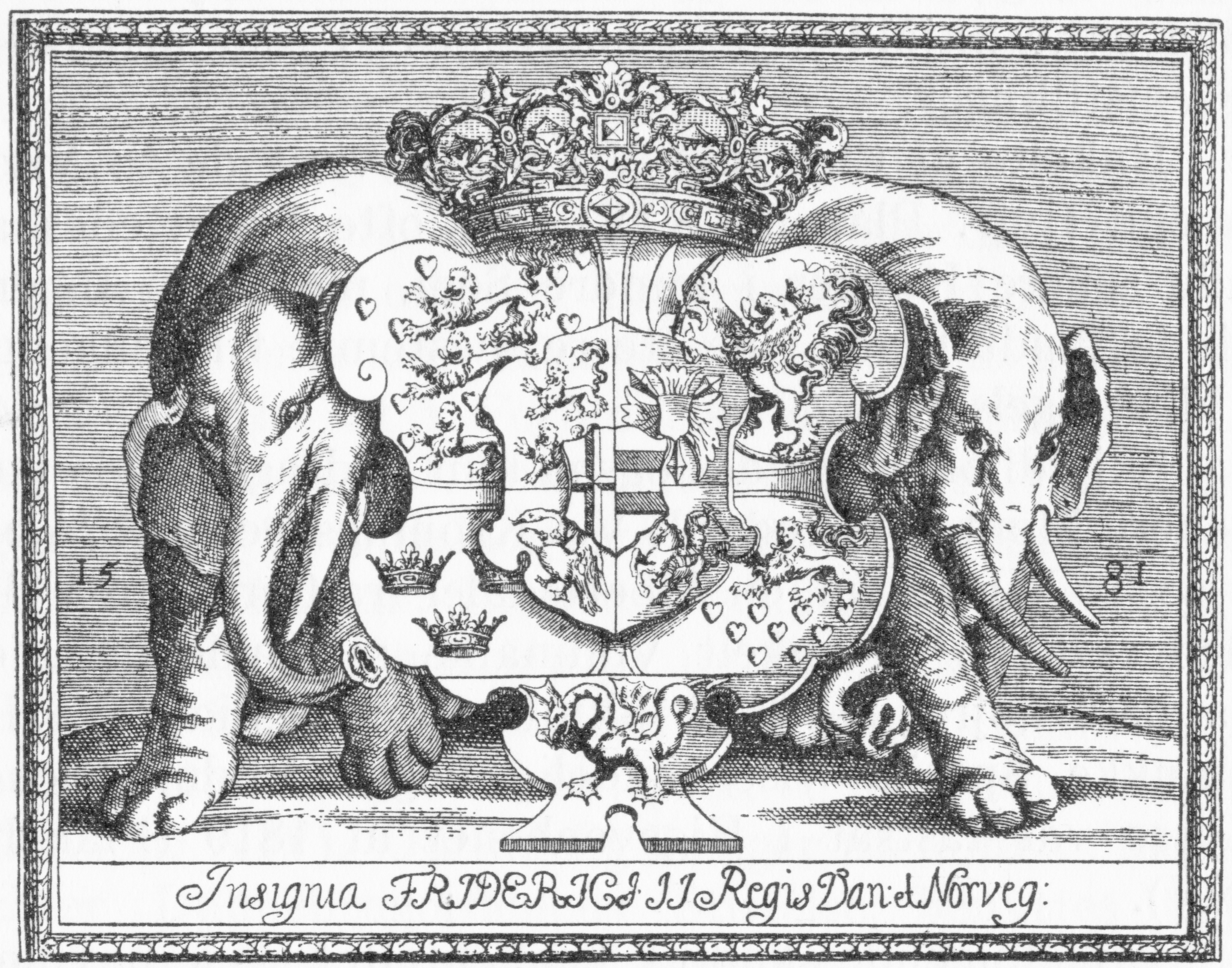
Coat of arms of Frederick II. Engraving by Jens Bircherod, 1581

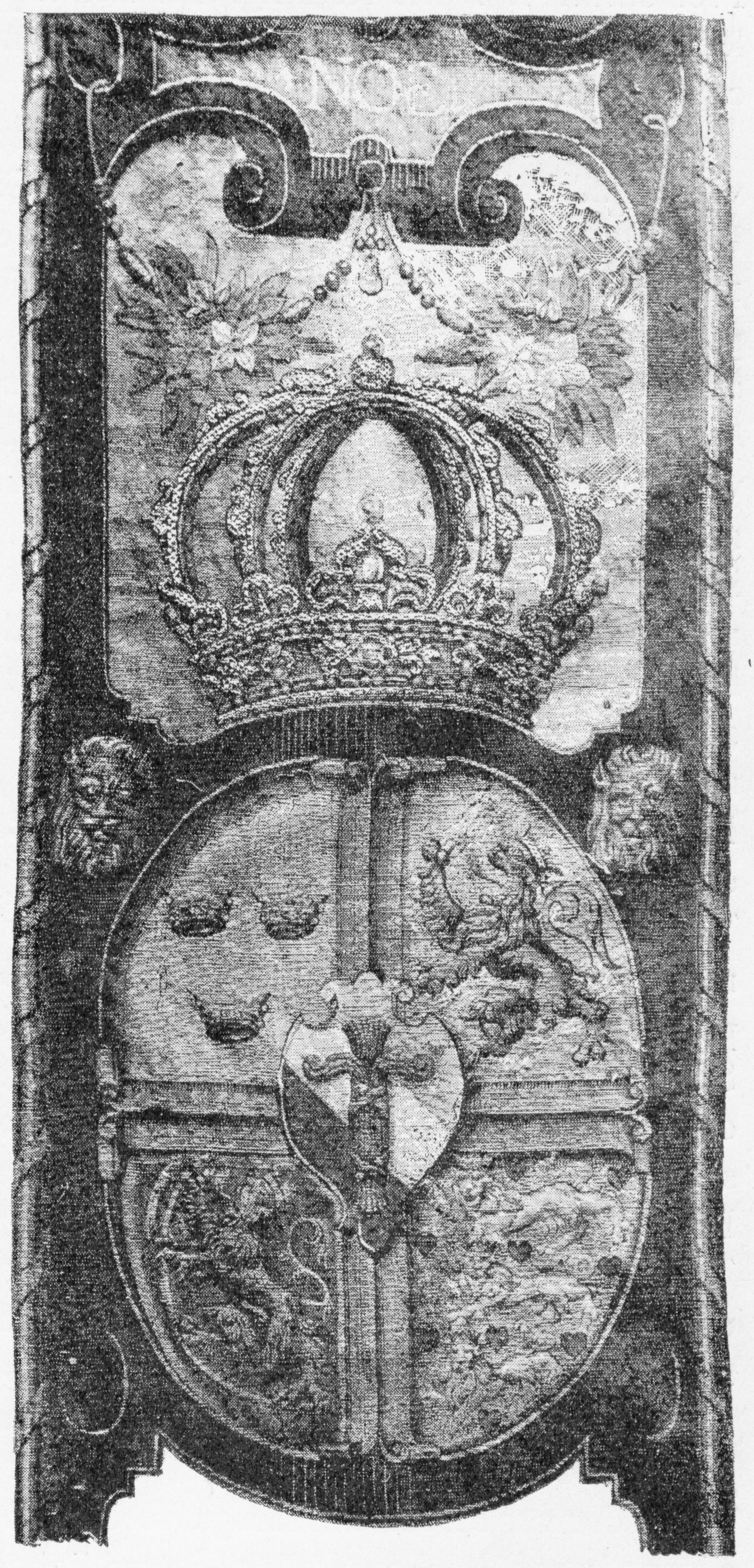
Eric XIV of Sweden added the Norwegian and Danish arms to the Swedish national coat of arms (the two lower quarters). This was one of the main events leading to the Northern Seven Years' War.

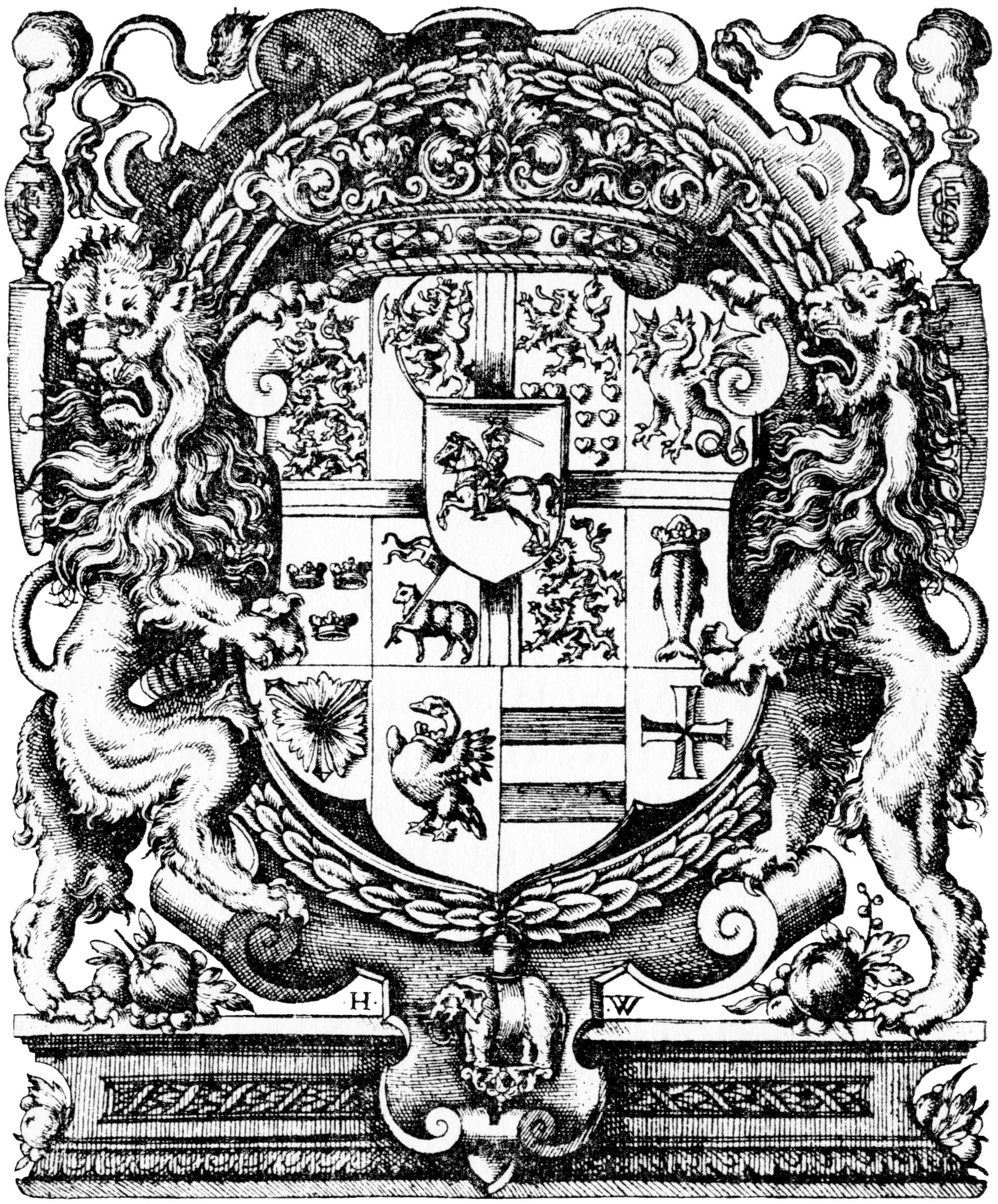
Coat of arms of Frederick II, 1592 engraving

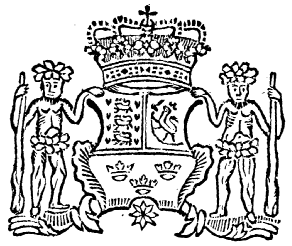
Coat of arms from the first issue of Kongelig allene privilegerede Tronhiems Adresse-Contoirs Efterretninger, 1767, showing the arms of Denmark, Norway and the Kalmar Union

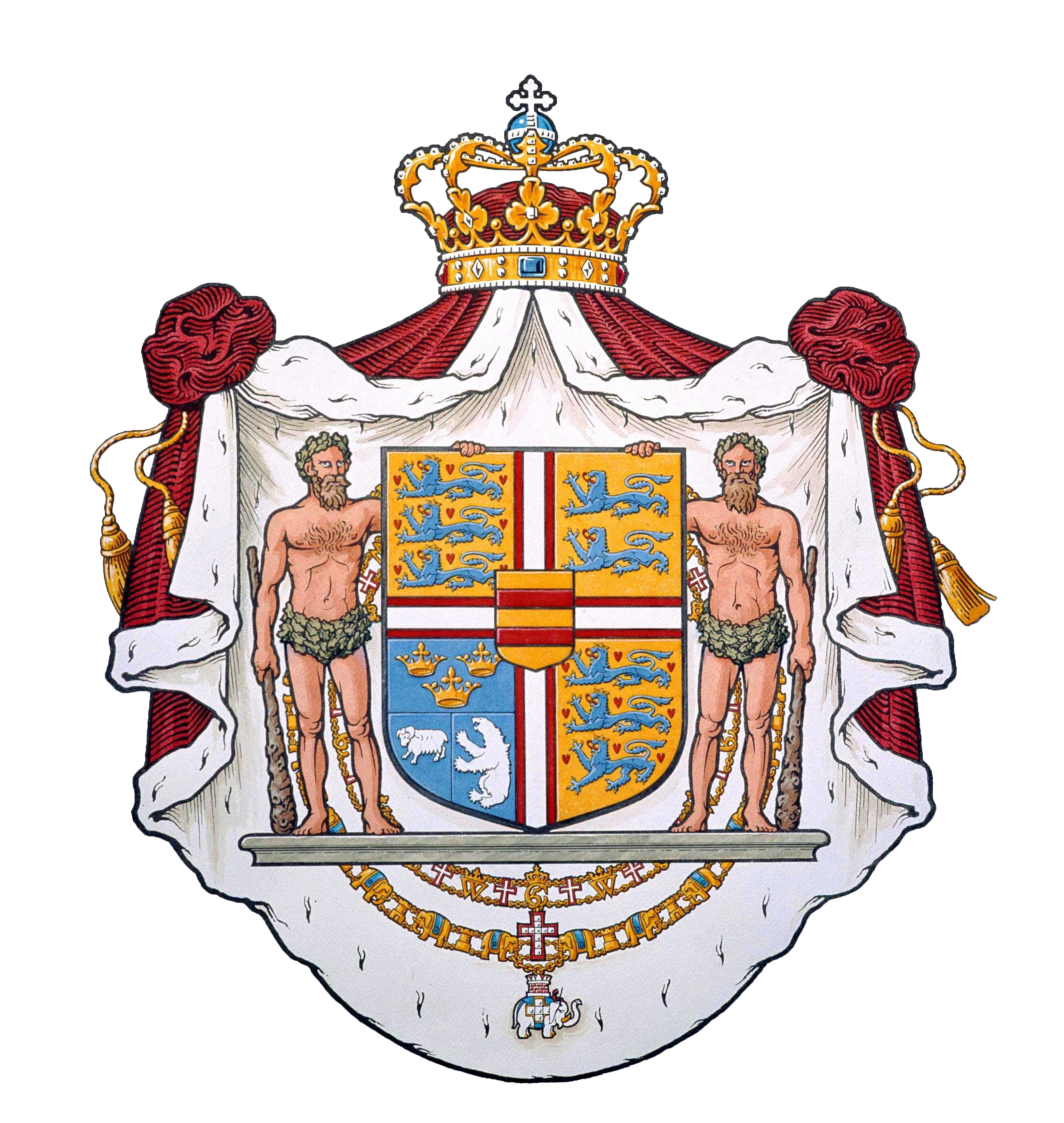
Royal coat of arms, 1972–2024

=== Elements currently used in the arms ===
Denmark

Faroe Islands

Greenland

Oldenburg

Schleswig
Flag of Denmark/Dannebrog

=== Elements formerly used in the arms ===
Bavaria

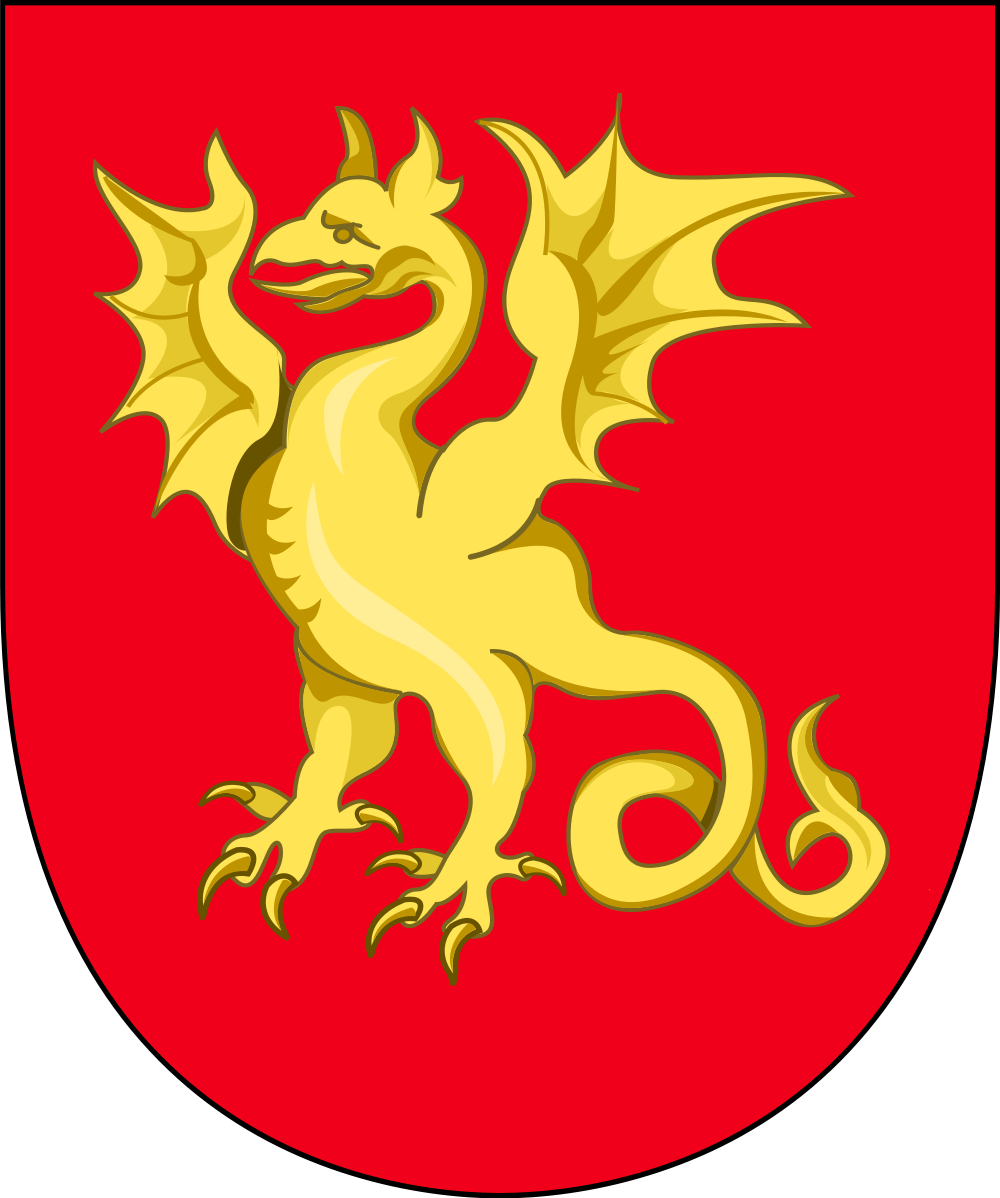
Bornholm

Delmenhorst

Ditmarsken

Femern

King of the Goths/Jutland

Gotland

The Swedish royal House of Bjälbo, in the 17th century perceived as the arms of Götaland

Holstein

Iceland

Iceland in later arms.

Palatinate

Lauenborg

Norway

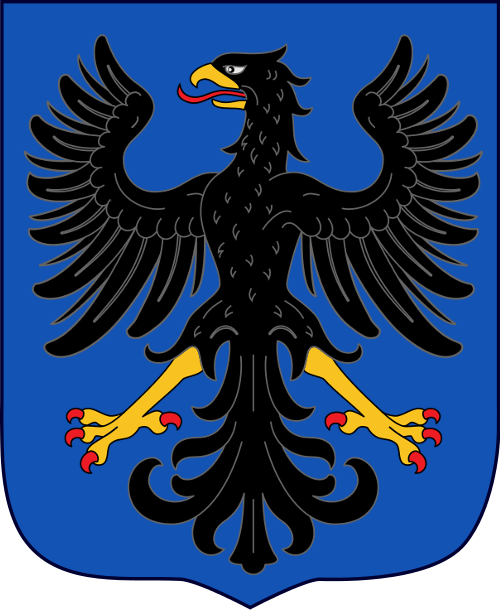
Øsel

Pomerania

Stormarn

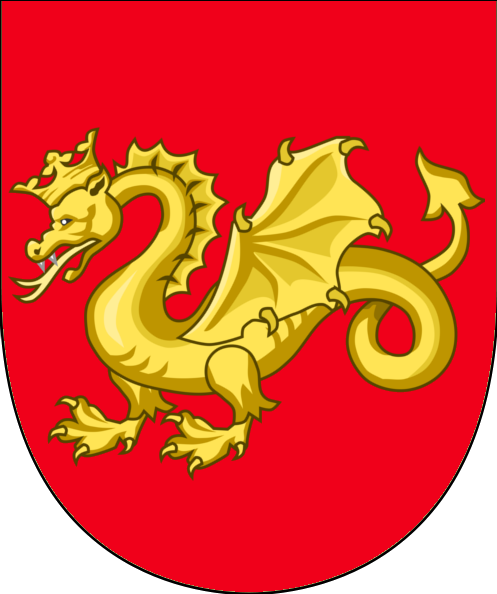
King of the Wends/Funen

Kalmar Union

== Related symbols ==
Small Coat of arms of Estonia

- The coat of arms of Estonia and its capital, Tallinn
- The coat of arms of Schleswig (also represented in the coat of arms of Denmark's royal family)
- The coats of arms of the towns of Ribe, Varde, Halmstad and Ystad.
- The coat of arms of the former South Jutland County
- The coat of arms of the former North Jutland County
- The coat of arms of the German district of Lüneburg
- The coat of arms of Schleswig-Holstein
- The coats of arms of the German town of Dannenberg
- The coat of arms of the Estonian Knighthood
- The personal arms of Prince Philip, Duke of Edinburgh contained the arms of Denmark in the first (upper left) quarter of the shield, and the sinister (left-side) supporter was based on the savage from the Danish arms. He used them on account of his descent from the Greek Schleswig-Holstein-Sonderburg-Glücksburg branch of the Danish House of Oldenburg.
- The Danish lion and hearts is featured in the Order of Saints George and Constantine and the Order of Saints Olga and Sophia, awarded by the Greek royal family.

== See also ==
- Coat of arms of Greenland
- Coat of arms of the Faroe Islands
- Danish heraldry
- Royal Arms of England
- Flag of Denmark
- Coat of arms of Estonia
- Lion (heraldry)
