= Coat of arms of Estonia =

- Greater version

Versions
- Lesser version
- Armiger: Republic of Estonia
- Adopted: 19 June 1925
- Shield: Or, three lions passant guardant azure, langued and armed gules
- Other elements: A garland of oak leaves surrounds the greater arms

The coat of arms of the Republic of Estonia (Estonian: Eesti riigivapp) is a golden shield which includes a picture of three left-facing blue lions with red tongues and claws in the middle, with golden oak branches placed on both sides of the shield. The coat of arms was derived from the 13th century royal coat of arms of Denmark, as the Duchy of Estonia (1219–1346) in what is now northern Estonia was part of Denmark at the time.

== Description ==
The coat of arms depicts a golden shield, which includes three slim blue lions passant gardant with red tongues in the middle and golden oak branches along both sides of the shield. The lesser coat of arms lacks these oak branches. The three lions on the national symbol of Estonia originate from the arms of King Valdemar II of Denmark who conquered northern Estonia in 1219. The lions became part of the greater coat of arms of Tallinn (Reval), the centre of Danish government in Estonia, and the fiefdoms (German: Ritterschaften) of Harria and Viru.

In 1346, the king of Denmark sold his Estonian dominion to the State of the Teutonic Order. The three lions, however, remained the central element of the greater coat of arms of Tallinn. In later centuries, the motif of the three lions transferred to the coats of arms of the Duchy of Estonia, the Estonian Knighthood, the Governorate of Estonia, and incorporated into the greater coat of arms of the Russian Empire. The Riigikogu (parliament) of the newly independent Republic of Estonia adopted the law which confirmed it as the national coat of arms on 19 June 1925.

During World War II, following the Soviet invasion and occupation of Estonia in June 1940, the display of the coat of arms, as well as of any other national symbols of Estonia, was banned by the new Stalinist regime. The symbols were replaced with Soviet-inspired emblems. The Soviet authorities persecuted anyone using the coat of arms or the national colours of Estonia. After World War II the coat of arms remained in use in the Western Bloc countries by a number of surviving diplomatic representatives of the Republic of Estonia, by the Estonian government-in-exile and by the large Estonian diaspora.

The coat of arms along with other national symbols were readopted on 7 August 1990, this marked one of the high points in the struggle for the restoration of the independent Estonian state which was eventually achieved on 20 August 1991. The use of the coat of arms is regulated by the Law on State Coat of Arms, passed on 6 April 1993.

== Gallery ==
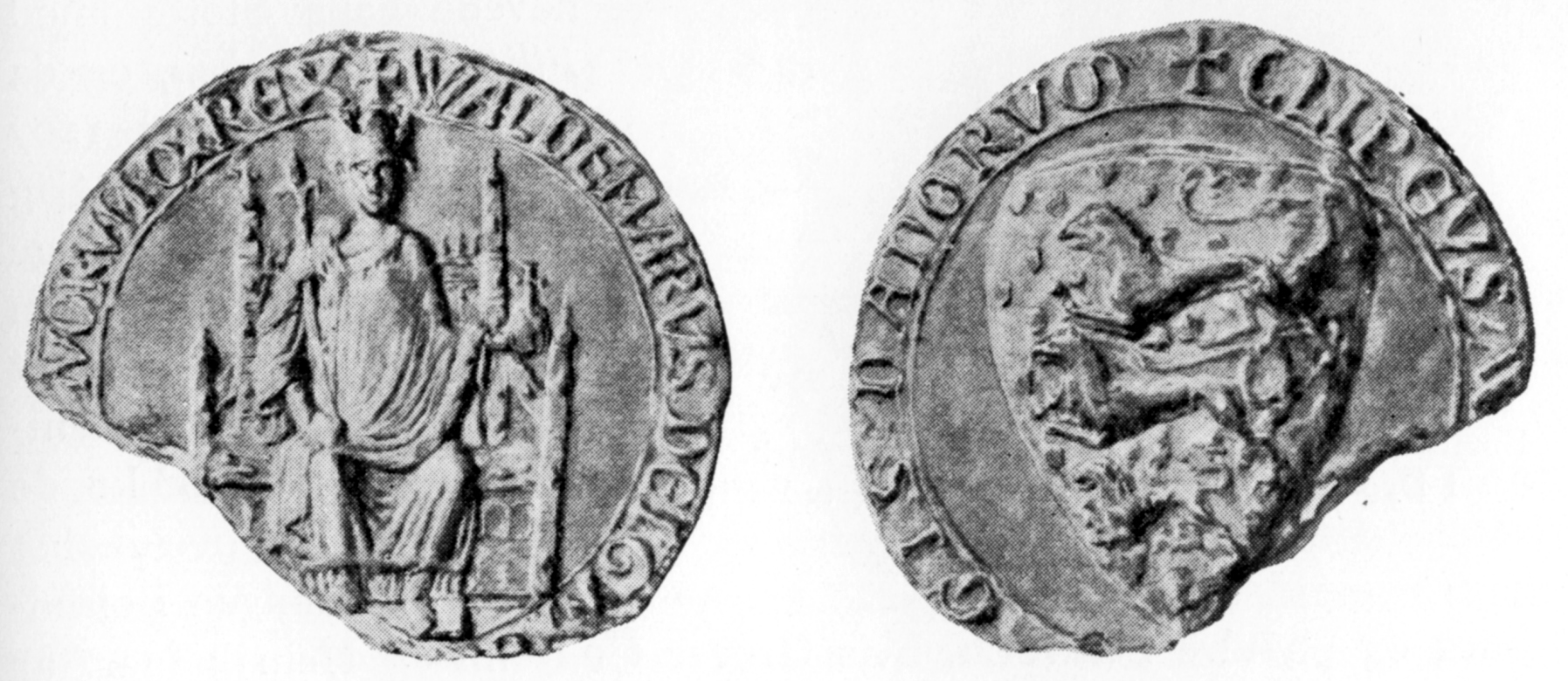
Seal of Danish king Valdemar II, 1219.

Seal of Tallinn (former Hanseatic city of Reval), 1340.

Flag of Tallinn, since 13th century based on the three blue lions of the coat of arms.

Greater coat of arms of capital city Tallinn.

Coat of arms of the Duchy of Estonia, 1561–1721

Coat of arms of the Governorate of Estonia, 1721–1918.

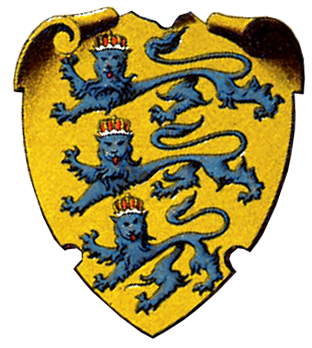
Coat of arms of the Estonian Knighthood as documented in Baltisches Wappenbuch

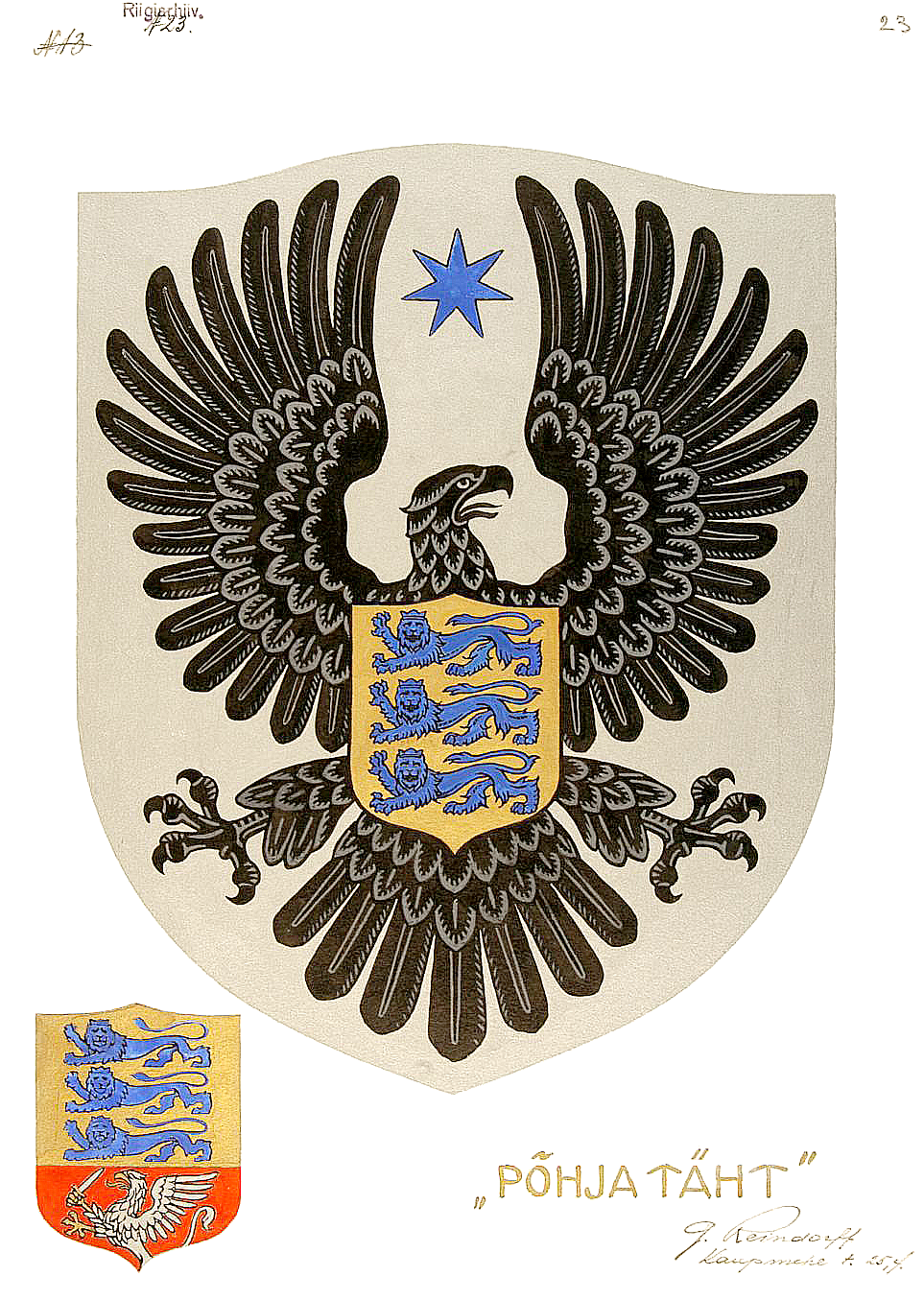
An alternative coat of arms proposal, 1922 (submitted by Günther Reindorff).

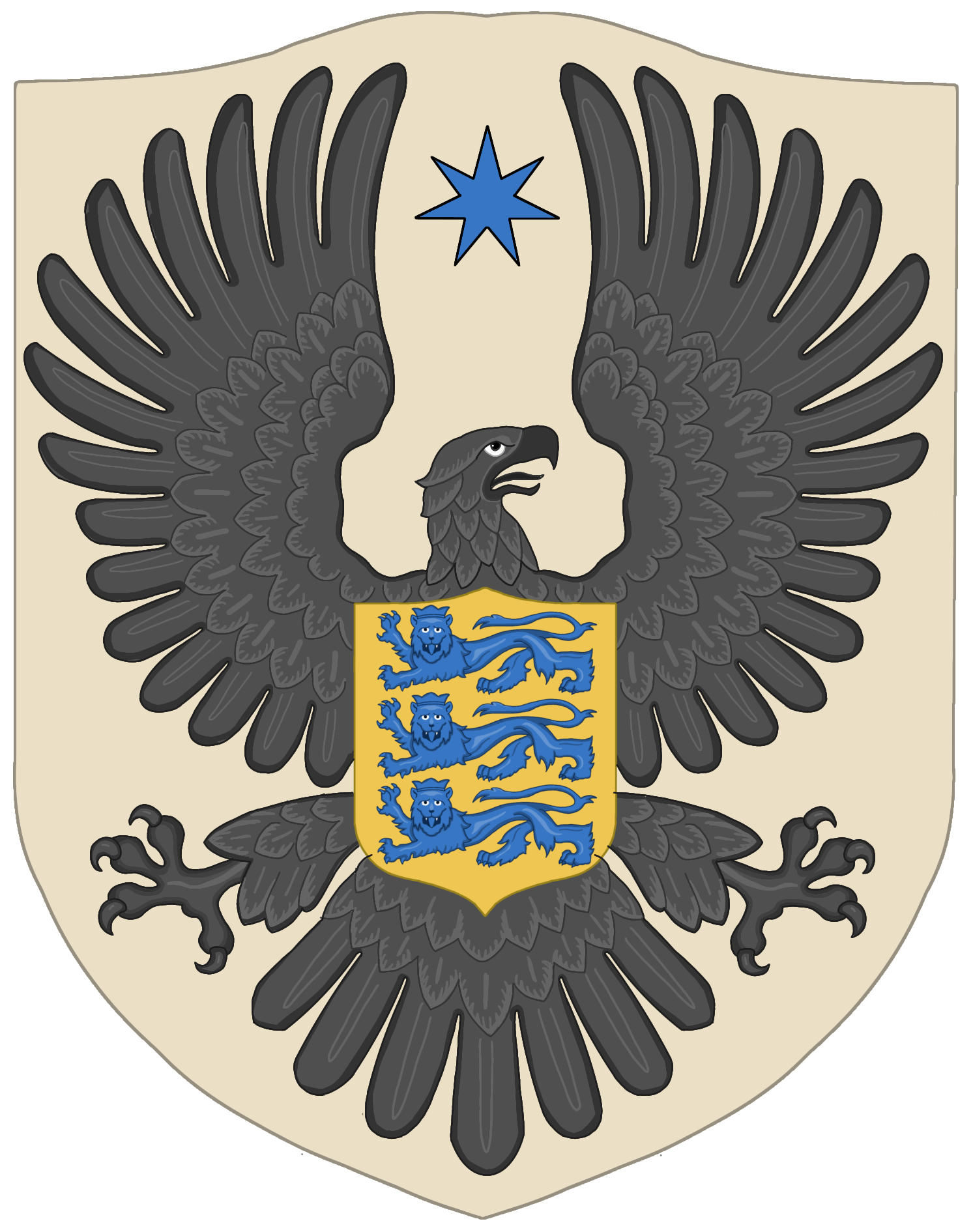
An alternative coat of arms proposal, 1922. (Vectorized)

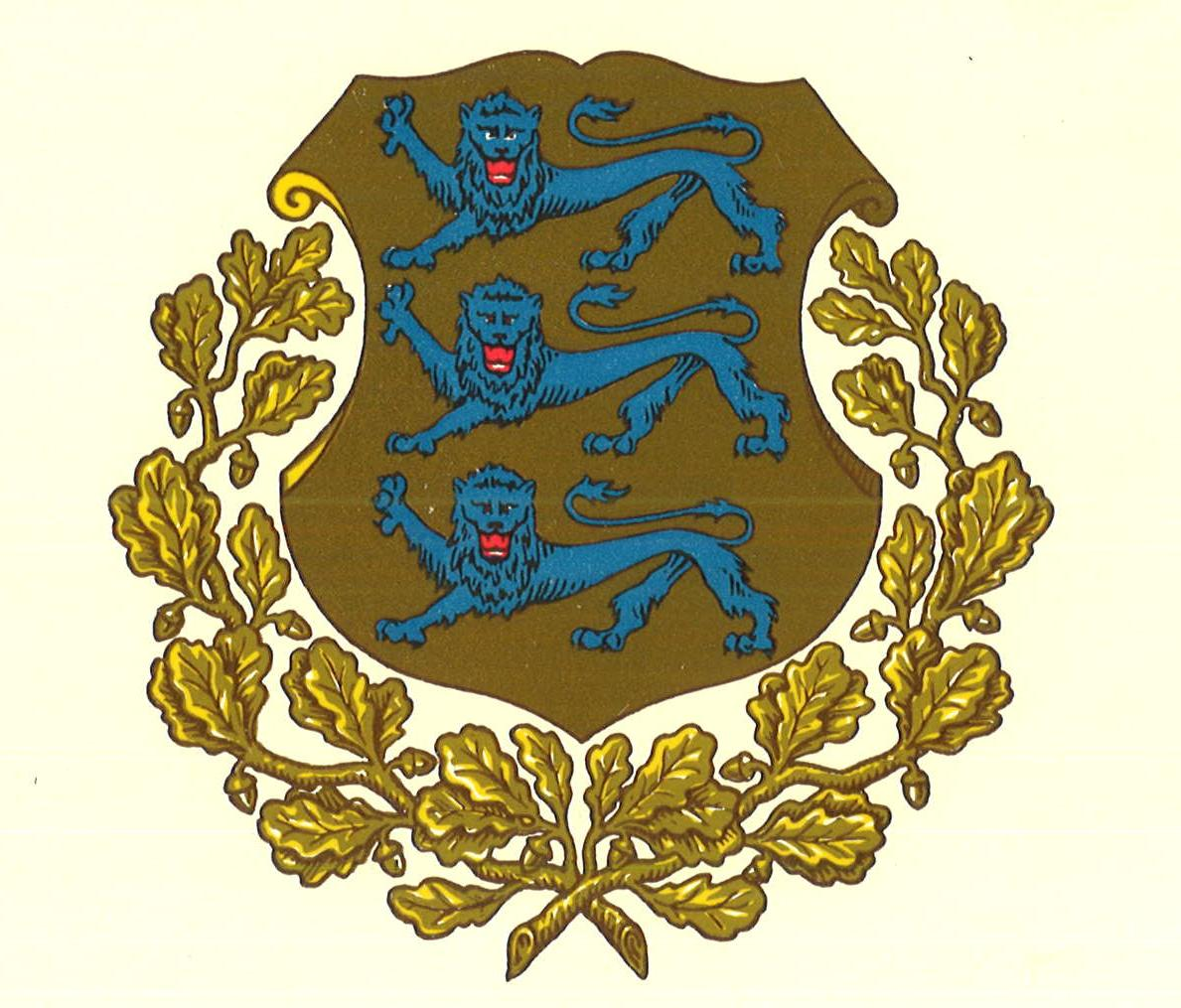
The first (1925) version of the national coat of arms.

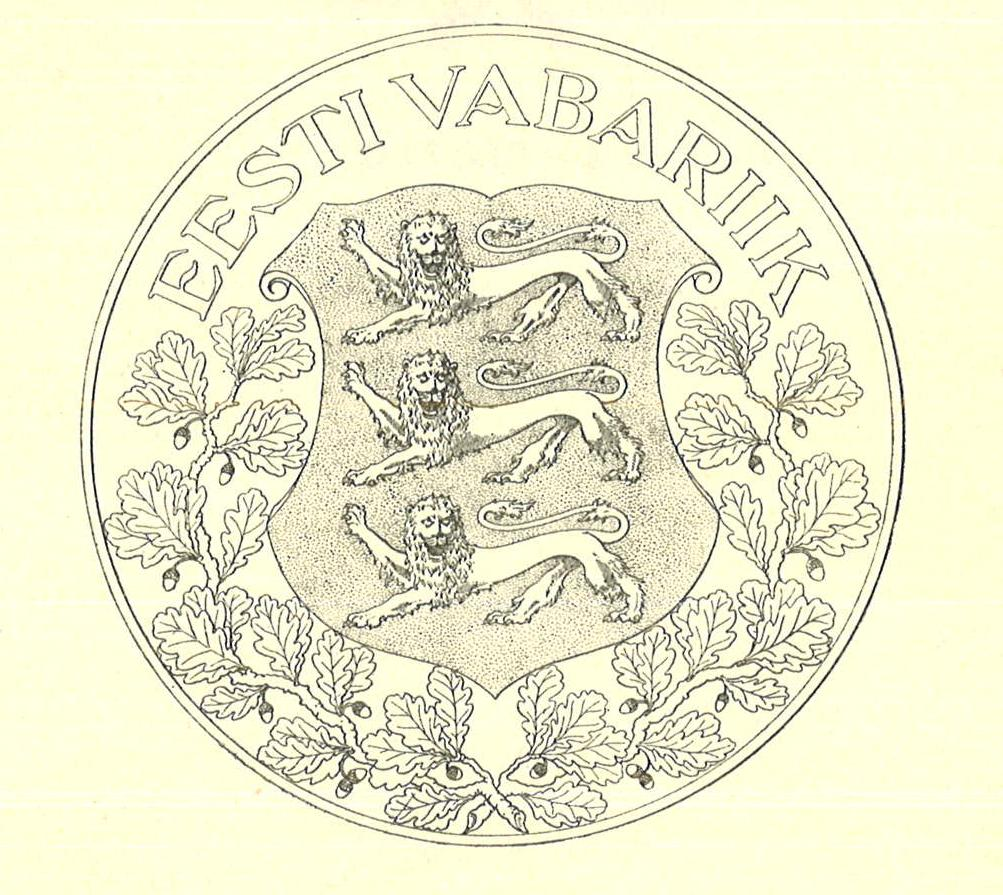
The version of state seal used in 1925–1993.

Flag of the Estonian Defence Forces.

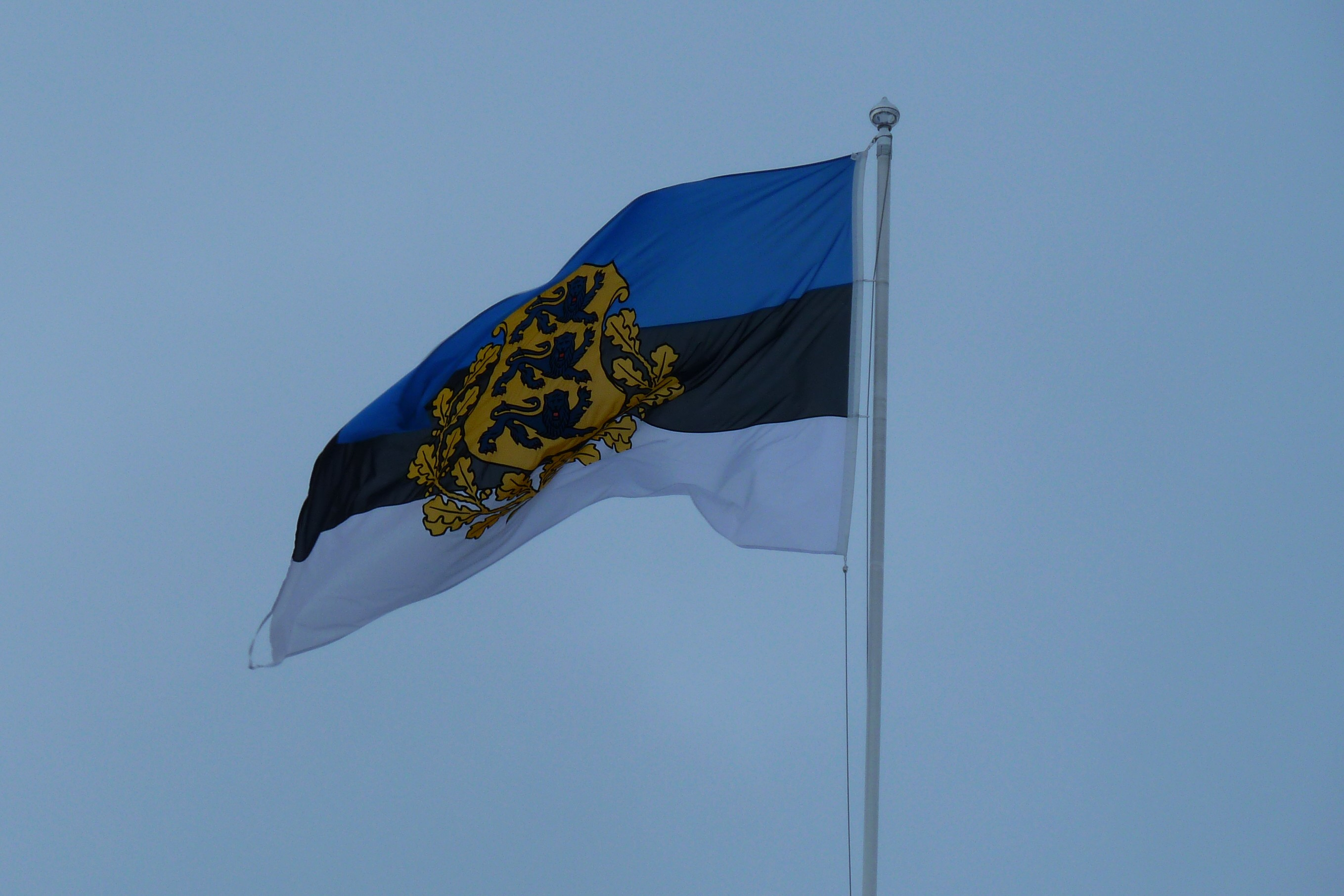
Presidential standard of Estonia.

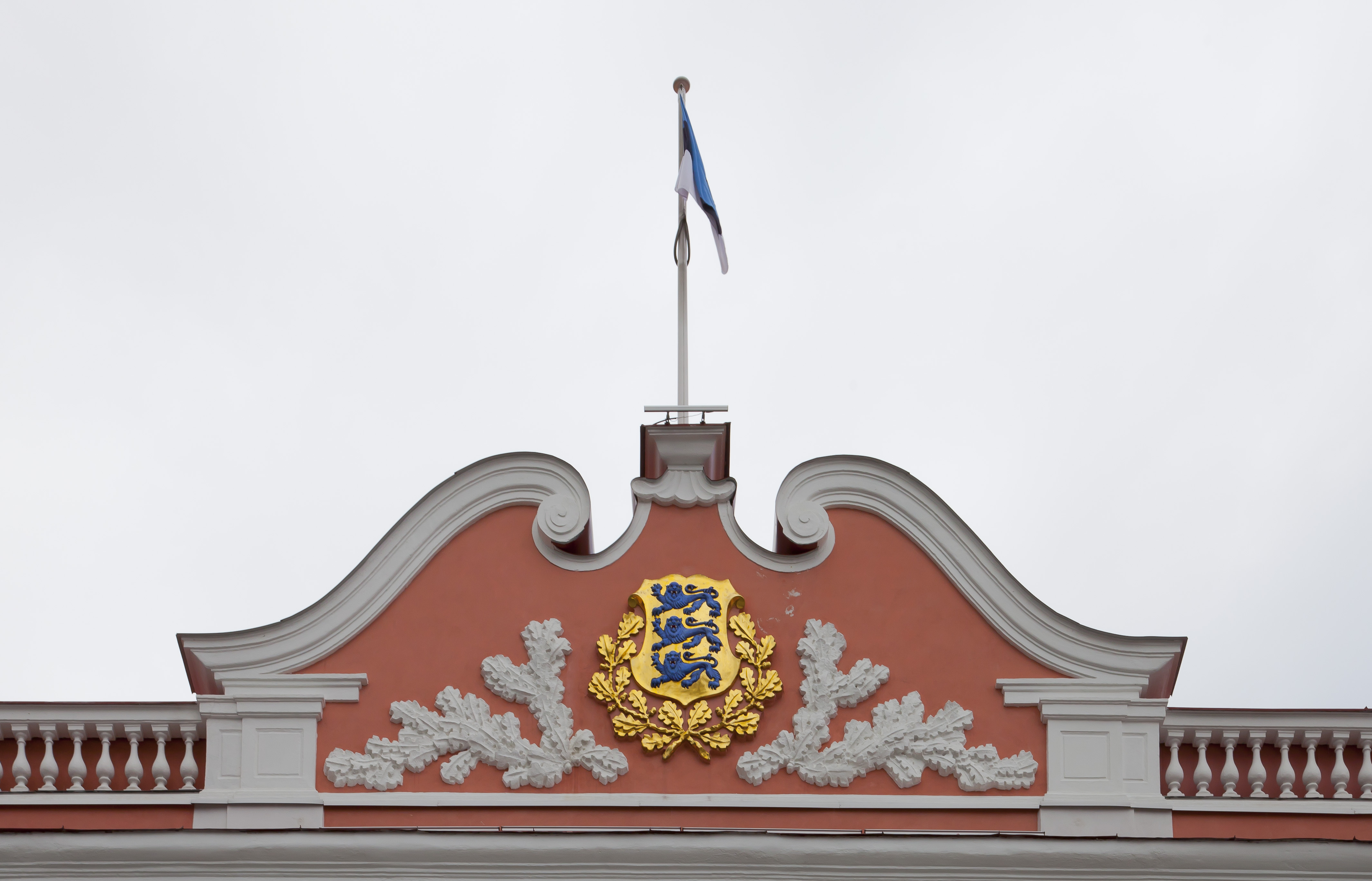
Toompea Castle in Tallinn, 2012.

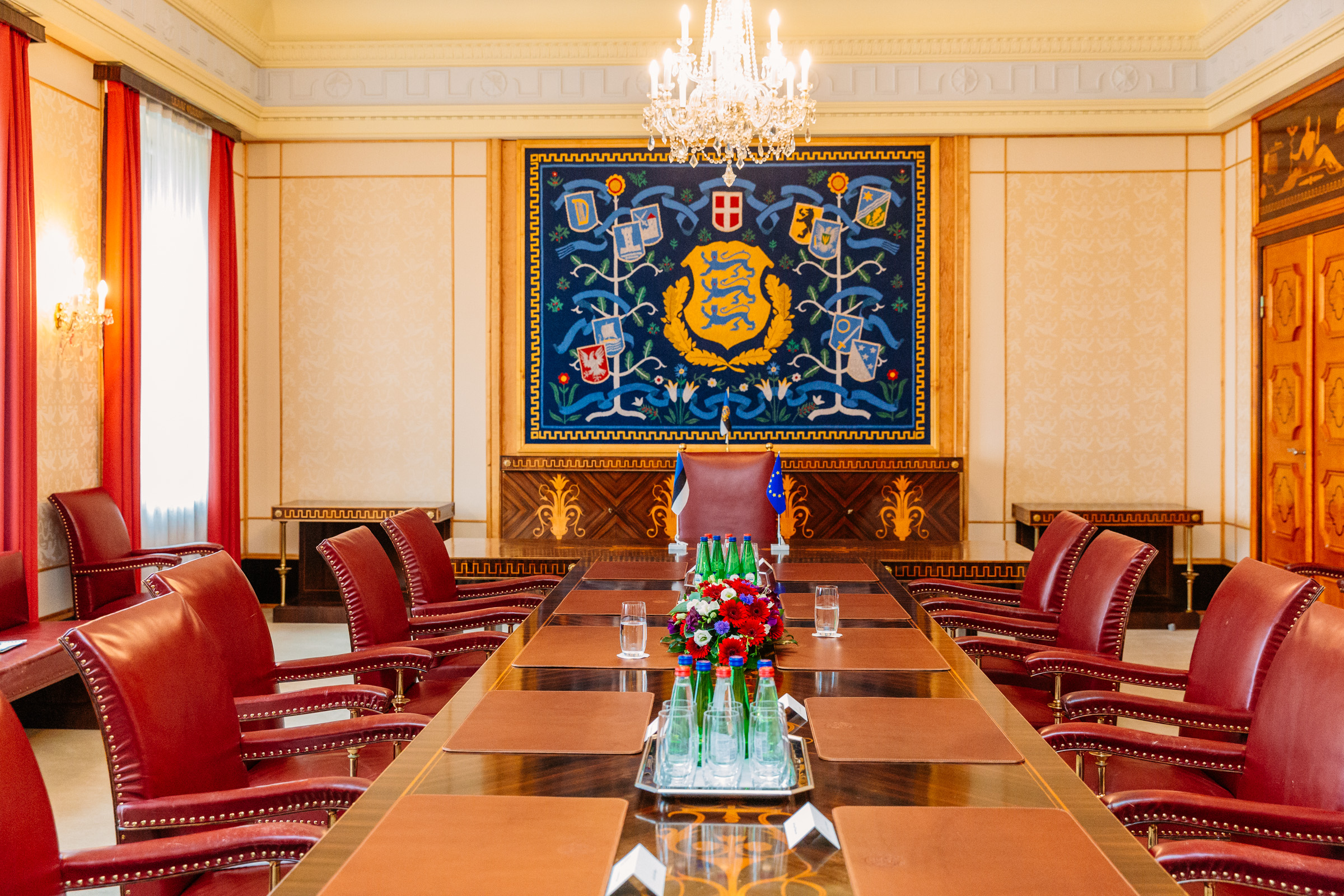
State Council Hall of the Presidential Palace, 2017.

== See also ==
- Armorial of Estonia
- Flag of Estonia
- National symbols of Estonia
