= Emblem of the Estonian Soviet Socialist Republic =

- Armiger: Estonian Soviet Socialist Republic
- Adopted: 1940
- Crest: A star Gules fimbriated Argent
- Shield: Issuant from the base a sun surmounted in chief by a hammer and sickle Or.
- Supporters: Dexter a branch of a coniferous tree, sinister a bundle of rye stalks both Proper.
- Motto: Kõigi maade proletaarlased, ühinege! (Estonian); Пролетарии всех стран, соединяйтесь! (Russian) ("Workers of the world, unite!")

The Emblem of the Estonian SSR was adopted by the Stalinist authorities after the Soviet Union had occupied and annexed Estonia in August 1940. The emblem features a sunrise accented by sunbeams, the hammer and sickle for the victory of communism and the "world-wide socialist community of states", and the red star to represent the affiliation to communism. The emblem consists mainly of the colors red, yellow and green.

In the lower part the interlaced text reads in Estonian: Eesti NSV, an abbreviation for Eesti Nõukogude Sotsialistlik Vabariik ('Estonian Soviet Socialist Republic'). To the right, rye stalks encircle the center of the coat of arms, and to the left arcs a branch of a coniferous tree.

The banner bears the Soviet Union state motto, "Workers of the world, unite!", in both Estonian and Russian.

The official usage of the Soviet emblem was discontinued in Estonia in 1990, as the country switched back to the original coat of arms of independent Estonia along with other national symbols, display of which had been banned under Soviet rule.

== See also ==
- Coat of arms of Estonia
