= Flag of Tallinn =

Estonian municipal flag

- Proportion: 1:2
- Adopted: 13th century
- Design: Six alternating blue and white bars

The flag of Tallinn (Estonian: Tallinna lipp), the capital city of Estonia, consists of six equally sized alternating horizontal bars, three blue and three white. Its official ratio of length and width is 2:1, and the normal size (as stipulated by law in 1996) is 160 × 80 cm.

The three blue stripes on the flag of Tallinn (former Hanseatic city of Reval) have since the 13th century been based on the three blue lions of the coat of arms of Tallinn and Estonia and symbolize strength and bravery. The white stripes meanwhile, represent peace, freedom and integrity.

== History ==
The flag was used as the standard for the city’s commercial fleet in the middle ages. It is still used in souvenirs, historical reenactments and city celebrations.

== See also ==
- Coat of arms of Tallinn
