= Order of the Dannebrog =

Danish order of chivalry

Order of the Dannebrog Dannebrogordenen
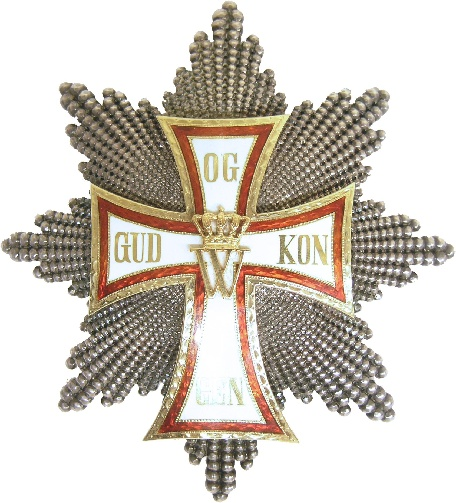
- Order of the Dannebrog, Breast Star of the Grand Cross, unofficial model

Awarded by Sovereign of Denmark
- Type: Chivalric order with six grades, one grade augmentation, and one related decoration
- Established: 12 October 1671
- Country: Kingdom of Denmark
- Ribbon: White with red edges
- Motto: Gud og Kongen (Danish for 'God and the King')
- Criteria: Meritorious civil or military service, for a particular contribution to the arts, sciences or business life, or for those working for Danish interests
- Status: Currently constituted
- Founder: Christian V
- Grand Master: Frederik X
- Grades: Grand Commander (S.Kmd.); Grand Cross (S.K.); Commander 1st Class (K.1); Commander (K.); Knight 1st Class (R.1); Knight (R.)

Precedence
- Next (higher): Order of the Elephant
- Next (lower): Medal of Merit
- Related: Decoration of the Cross of Honour of the Dannebrog
- Grand Commander Grand Cross Commander 1st Class Commander Knight 1st Class Knight; Ribbon bars of the Order

The Order of the Dannebrog (Danish: Dannebrogordenen) is a Danish order of chivalry instituted in 1671 by Christian V, inspired by the legend that the Dannebrog flag fell from the sky in 1219. The Order's ribbon reflects the flag's colors, white and red, and the badge takes the form of the Dannebrog cross, as used in the royal coat of arms since the 17th century.

Until 1808, membership in the Order was limited to fifty members of noble or royal rank, who formed a single class known as White Knights to distinguish them from the Blue Knights who were members of the Order of the Elephant. In 1808, the Order was reformed and divided into four classes.

Today, the Order of the Dannebrog is a means of honouring and rewarding the faithful servants of the modern Danish state for meritorious civil or military service, for a particular contribution to the arts, sciences or business life, or for working for Danish interests. Therefore women have been eligible for the Order since 1951. The reigning monarch serves as Grand Master, and appointments are typically made on ministerial recommendation.

== Insignia ==
The badge of the Order is a white enamelled Dannebrog cross (i.e., a cross pattée, the lower arm being longer than the others) with a red enamelled border, for the Knights in silver, and for everyone else in gold or silver gilt. At the top of this cross is the royal cypher of the bestowing monarch, crowned with the distinctive Danish royal crown (Note: This royal crown is usually flat and of one piece with the badge itself, although some crowns, especially in badges made in the 19th century and early 20th centuries, are three dimensional, with the badge proper suspended from them.) On its front, the cross bears the royal cyphers of Christian V at its centre, as well as the motto of the Order: Gud og Kongen (God and the King) on its arms. On its reverse are found the crowned royal cyphers of Valdemar II Sejr, Christian V and Frederik VI, (Note: Valdemar II is the Danish king associated with the legendary origins of the Dannebrog and the reputed first founder of the Order, Christian V is the founder of the present Order and Frederik VI reformed the Order, dividing it into its present six grades) as well as the years 1219, 1671 and 1808, the years that each of them ascended the Danish throne. In each of the four angles of the cross is found a small Danish royal crown.

The collar of the Order is made of gold, with small enamelled Dannebrog crosses alternating with alternating crowned royal cyphers representing Kings Valdemar II Sejr and Christian V, the reputed and actual founders of the Order. When the collar is worn the sash is not worn.

The star of the Order is an eight-pointed silver star with straight rays with an enamelled Dannebrog cross (similar to the front of the badge but without the royal cypher above and the royal crowns between the arms of the cross) at the centre.

The breast cross of the Order is similar to the cross on the star but larger and with faceted silver instead of white enamel and without the silver rays of the star.

The ribbon of the Order is white silk moiré with red borders, the national colours of Denmark.

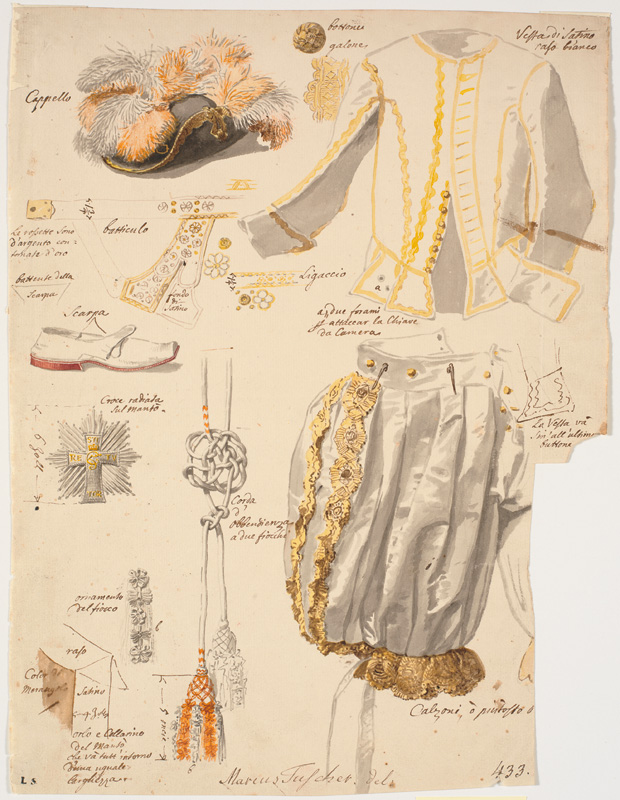
Details of the vestments of the Knights of the Dannebrog, c. 1750

The Order originally had a distinctive habit worn by the knights (after 1808, by the Knights Grand Cross) on very solemn occasions. The habit consisted of a white doublet, white breeches, white stockings and white shoes, over which was worn a red mantle with a white lining and with the star of the order embroidered in silver on its left side. Over this red mantle was worn a short white shoulder cape with a standing collar embroidered in gold, upon which was worn the collar of the Order (the habit was always worn with the collar and never with the ribbon of the Order). The habit also had a black hat with a plume of white and red ostrich feathers. This habit was almost identical to that worn by the knights of the Order of the Elephant.

== Grades ==
The Order is divided into six grades, which are grouped into four classes:

- Special class
  - Grand Commander (Storkommandør; S.Kmd.) – wears the badge with diamonds (Note: On this badge table cut diamonds entirely replace the white enamel of the cross and smaller diamonds completely cover the royal crowns in the angles of this cross, the royal cypher of the current monarch and its royal crown at the top of this cross as well as the connecting link by which this badge hangs from its ribbon. Only the red enamel border which surrounds the table cut diamond cross of the badge is not set with diamonds.) on a necklet (gentlemen) or on a bow (ladies), plus the star on the left chest;
- First Order class
  - Grand Cross (Storkors; S.K.) – wears the badge on a collar or on a sash on the right shoulder, plus the star on the left chest;
- Second Order class
  - Commander 1st Class (Kommandør af 1. grad; K.1) – wears the breast cross on the left chest, plus (for gentlemen) the badge on a neck ribbon;
  - Commander (Kommandør; K.) – wears the badge on a neck ribbon (gentlemen) or on a bow (ladies);
- Third Order class
  - Knight 1st Class (Ridder af 1. grad; R.1) – wears the badge on a ribbon (gentlemen) or on a bow (ladies) with rosette on the left chest;
  - Knight (Ridder; R.) – wears the badge on a ribbon (gentlemen) or on a bow (ladies) on the left chest.

The Grand Commander grade is reserved for persons of princely origin. It is awarded only to royalty with close family ties to the Danish Royal House. The Grand Cross grade can, as a special honor, be awarded 'with diamonds' (S.K.i diam., short for Storkors i diamanter). The Order also has a related decoration, known as the Cross of Honour (D.Ht., short for Dannebrogordens Hæderstegn). The insignia of the Order must be returned upon the death of the holder.

=== Order of wear ===
The order of wear for five of the six grades with their respective insignia (gentlemen) – 1: Knight; 2: Knight 1st Class; 3: Commander; 4: Commander 1st Class; 5: Grand Cross

== Cross of Honour ==
The Dannebrogordenens Hæderstegn (Cross of Honour of the Order of the Dannebrog) in modern times is only awarded to Danes on whom the Order of the Dannebrog has already been bestowed. It is also worn by members of the Danish royal family. Its badge is similar to the badge of the Order, but all in silver. It is worn on a ribbon (by gentlemen) or bow (by ladies), with rosette, on the left chest.

== Recipients ==
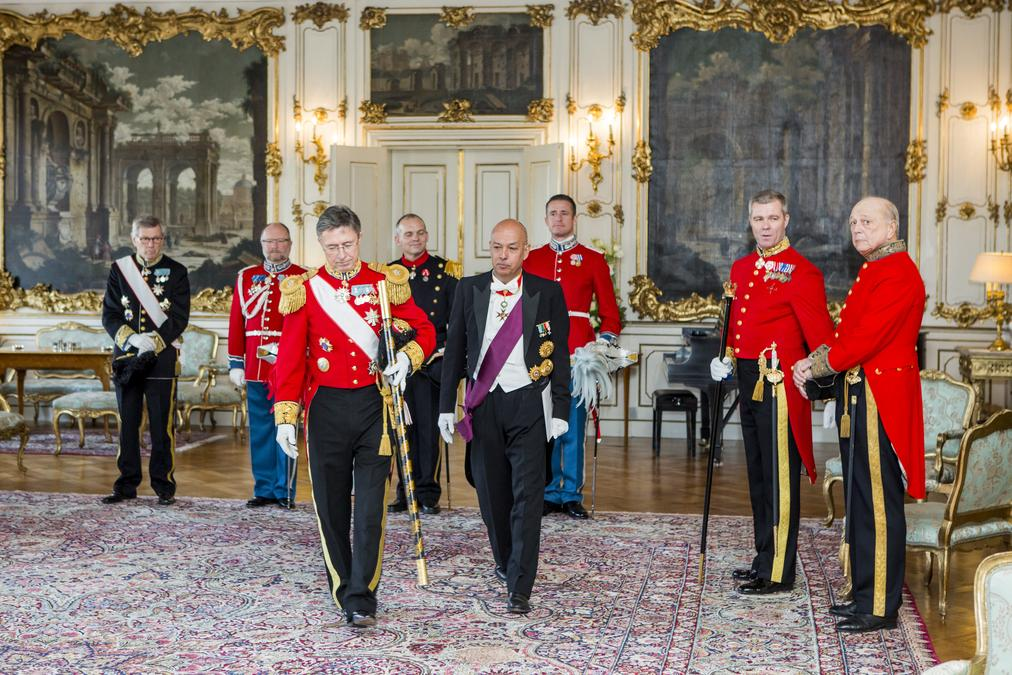
The Court Marshal of Denmark (at left) wearing the Grand Cross insignia

Each Danish ministry has a quota of Knights and Knights 1st class that they may use at their discretion. It is most often given to high-ranking officers of the police, armed forces and emergency services.

Also used for politicians in Folketinget after 8 years of elected service. Ministers are given the rank of Knight 1st Class.

The rank of Commander is given to colonels, ministers and other high-ranking officials as a retirement-decoration after long service. Commander 1st class is given for admirals, generals, Supreme-court judges, ambassadors, and other governmental leaders as a retirement decoration.

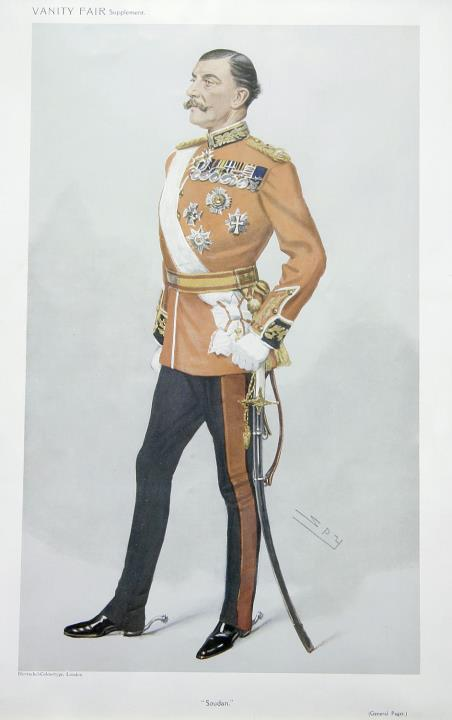
British general Sir Arthur Paget wearing the Grand Cross, 1908

The Grand Cross is most often used for admirals, generals, Supreme-court judges, ambassadors and similar as a reward for very meritorious service to Denmark.

Grand Cross with Breaststar with Diamonds (Note: I.e., fourteen table-cut diamonds are set on the white enamel of the cross of the Order, which in this case has no royal ciphers, dates nor motto.) is most often given to high-ranking officers of the Royal Court, such as Hofmarskals.

Finally, the Grand Commander grade is given only to 8 people. The reigning monarch is always a Grand Commander, and he/she may give the grade to 7 others, most often close family.

=== Diplomatic use ===
Award of the Order of the Dannebrog is often used as a tool of diplomacy. If a foreign country has an Order that they give to foreign diplomats in their country, then their diplomats in Denmark can be given an Order of the Dannebrog. To be eligible, the foreign ambassador must have resided in Denmark for at least three years.

Diplomatic rank	Rank of the Order
Ambassador	Grand Cross
Chargé d'Affaires e.p. (en pieds)	Commander (Commander 1st Class, if over 40 years of age)
Chargé d'Affaires a.i. (ad interim)	Commander or Knight 1st Class
Ambassador Advisor	Commander
1st Embassy Secretary	Knight 1st Class
2nd or 3rd Embassy Secretary	Knight
Defence Attachés	Depending on military rank
Other Attachés	Knight or Commander depending on merit

== Grand Commanders ==
Collar of the Order

1. His Majesty Frederik X, King of Denmark, Master of the Order (1 January 2004)
2. Her Majesty Margrethe II, former Queen of Denmark and former Master of the Order, (14 January 1972)
3. His Majesty Carl XVI Gustaf, King of Sweden (10 April 1975)
4. Her Royal Highness Benedikte, Princess of Denmark (27 January 1993)
5. His Royal Highness Joachim, Prince of Denmark (16 April 2004)
6. Her Majesty Mary, Queen of Denmark (26 May 2024)
7. His Royal Highness Christian, Crown Prince of Denmark (15 October 2026)

With the death of King Harald V of Norway in 2026, one Grand Commander position is available. The number of Grand Commanders never exceed 8.

== Revocation ==
It is possible for membership in the Order to be revoked. Before 1808, membership had only been revoked on two occasions – Peder Griffenfeld who was charged with treason, and Samuel Christoph von Plessen (1640–1704) who was charged with looting and gross misconduct. In more recent times, it has been revoked on the basis of criminality, such as Peter Adler Alberti (1910), Erik Ninn-Hansen (1995), Peter Brixtofte (2008) and Christian Kjær (2019). Foreigners have also had their membership revoked. Several prominent Nazi officials, such as Hermann Göring and Konstantin von Neurath, were awarded the Order, but it was later revoked.

== Jewelers and goldsmiths ==
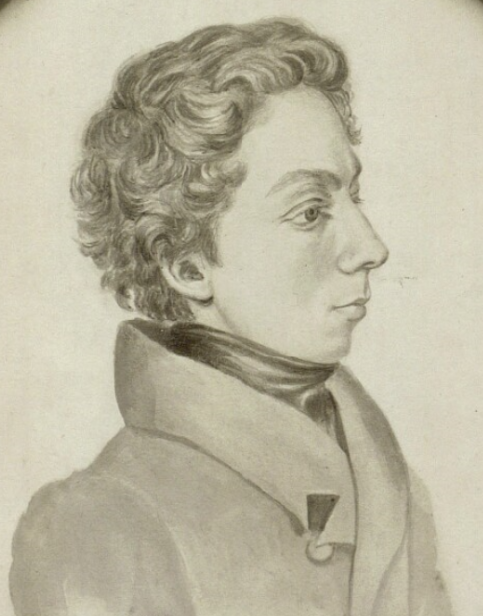
Anton Michelsen (1809–1877)

Below is a list of jewelers who have made the insignia for the Order:

Jeweler	Period
Royal Goldsmith Poul Kurtz	1655–1679
Royal Goldsmith Ferdinand Küblich	1670–1687
Royal Goldsmith Fridrich Kurtz	1679–1703
Royal Goldsmith Pierre Tresfort	1687–1729
Royal Goldsmith Jean Henri de Moor	1688–1696
Royal Goldsmith Andreas Normand	1700–1727
Royal Jeweler Frederik Fabritius	1746–1778
Royal Jeweler Christopher Fabritius	1778–1829
Royal Jeweler Frederik Fabritius	−1832
Royal Goldsmith Nicolai Christensen	?–1832
Jeweler Poul Ressen Eggersen	1832–1841
Royal Jeweler Anton Michelsen	1848–

Anton Michelsen was made a part of Royal Copenhagen A/S, which is now the supplier.

== Gallery ==
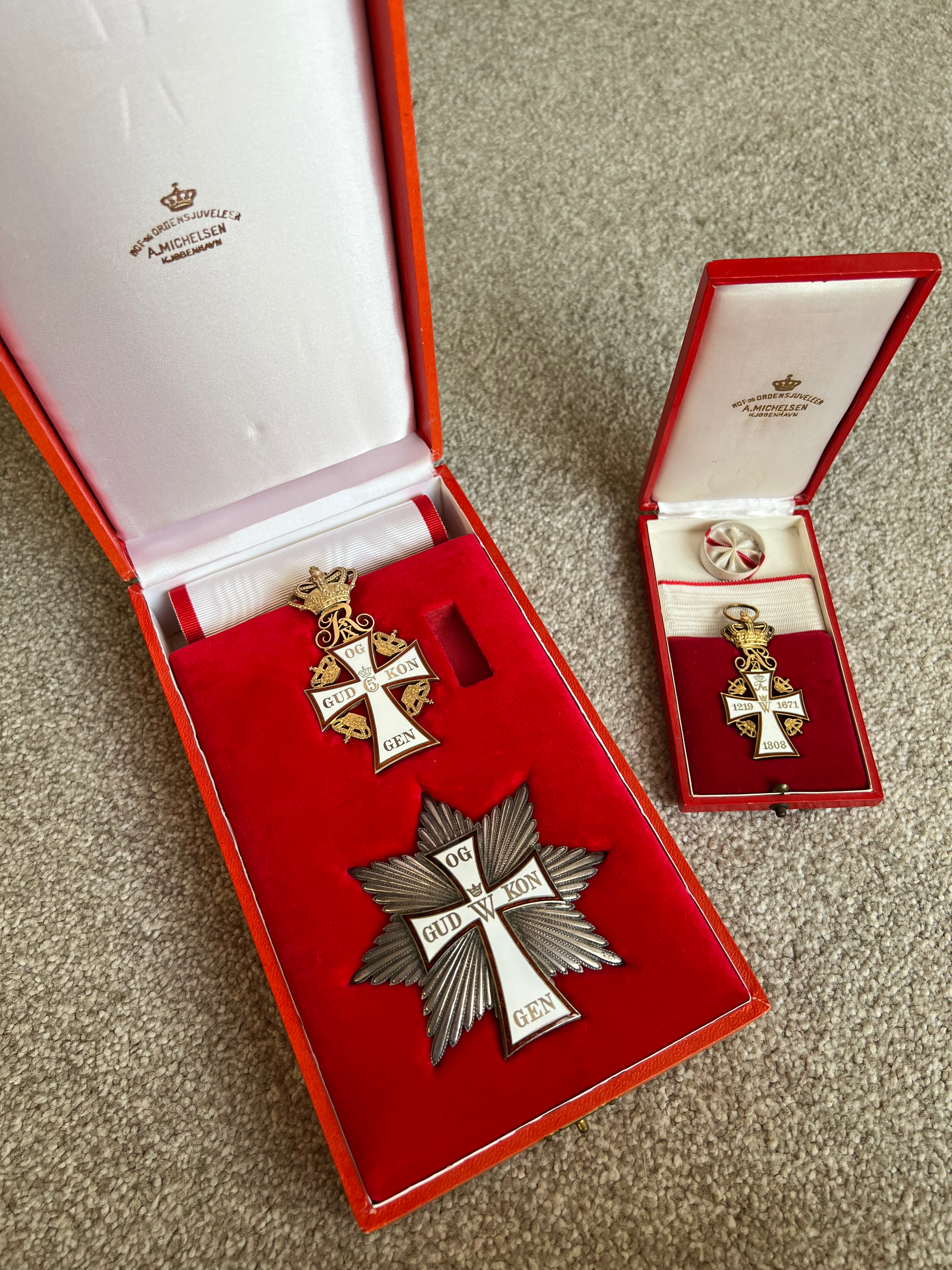
Grand Cross and knight 1st Class of the order

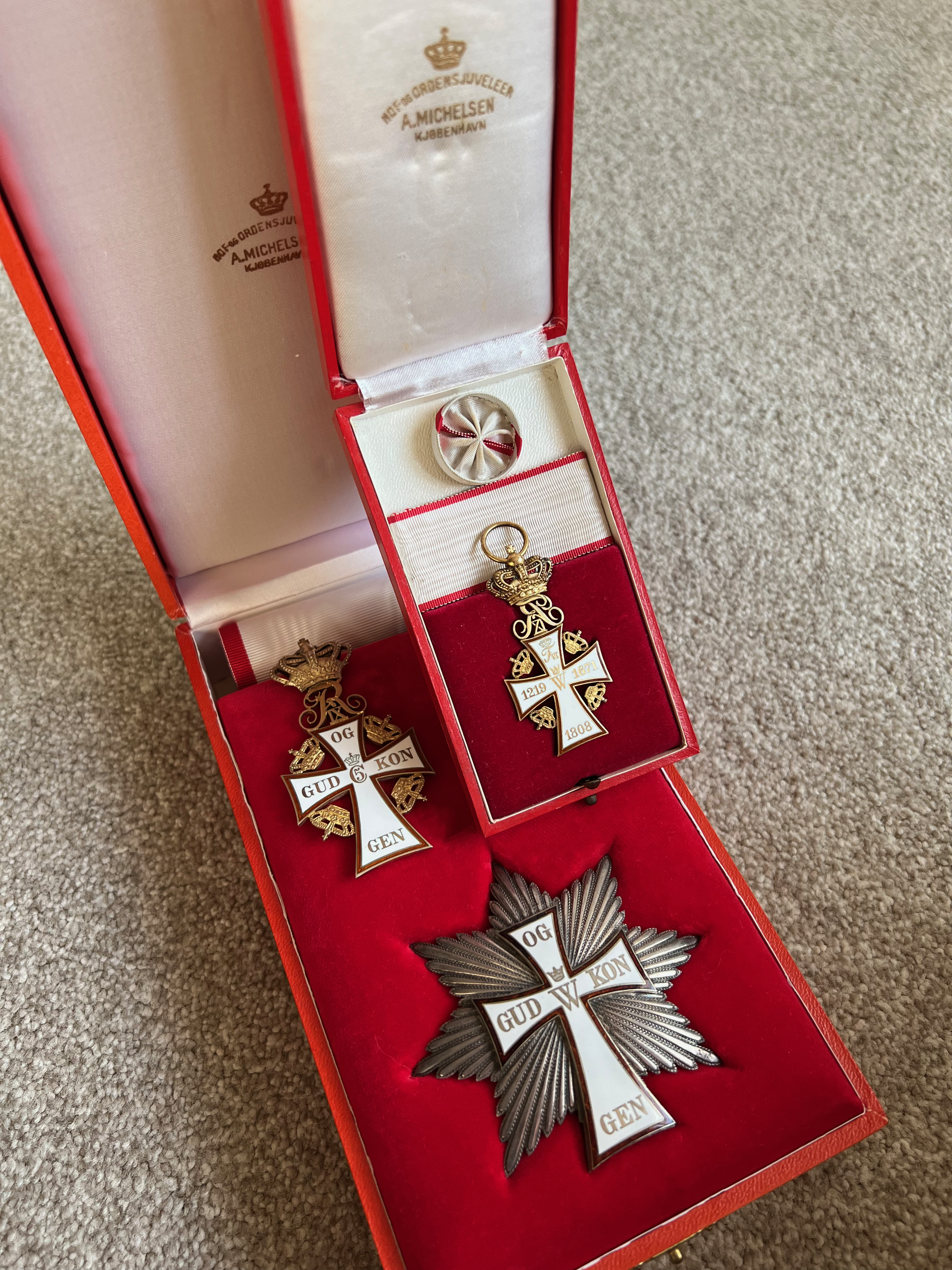
Grand Cross and knight 1st Class of the order

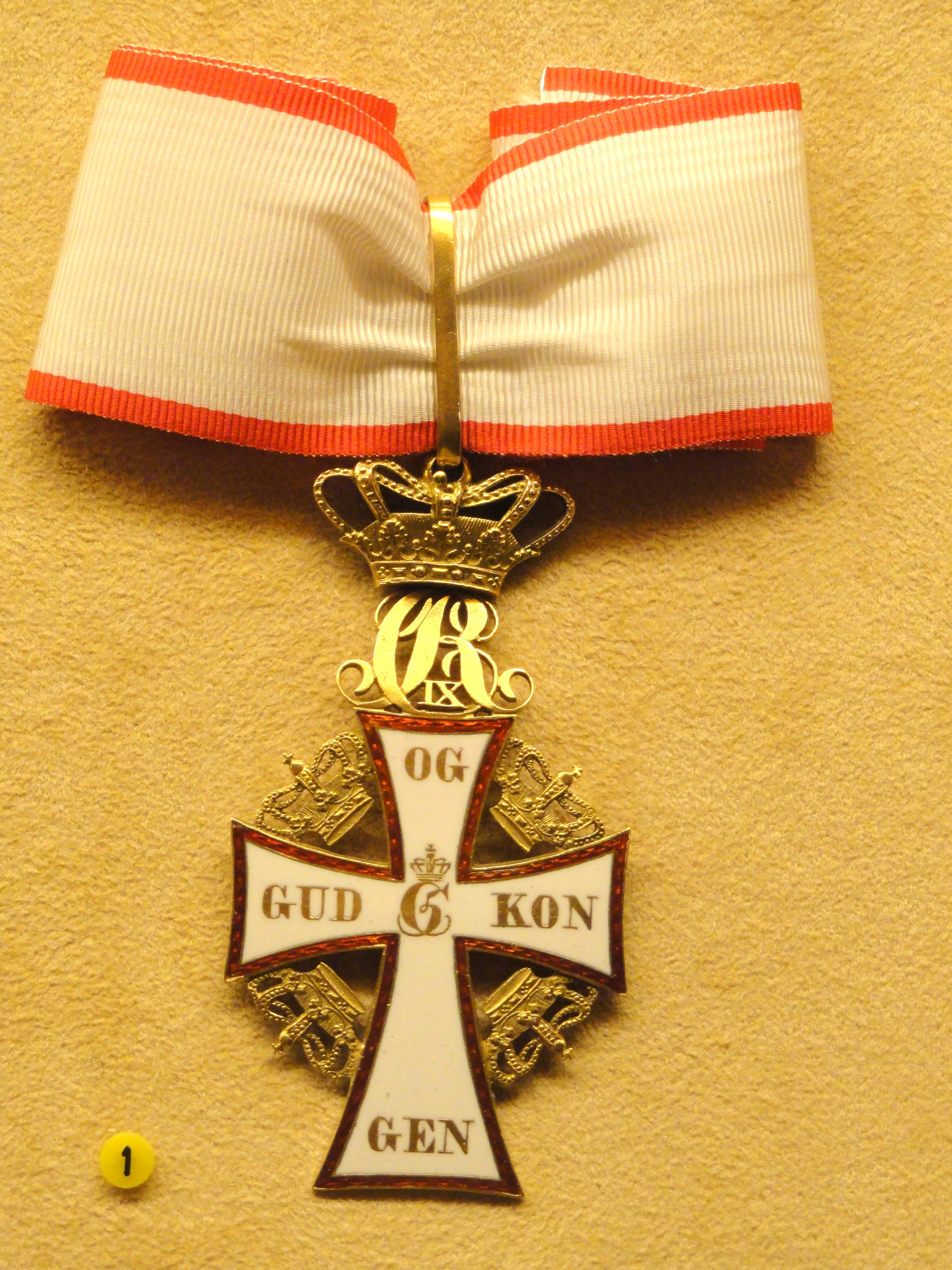
Commander 2nd Class set of insignia from the reign of Christian IX

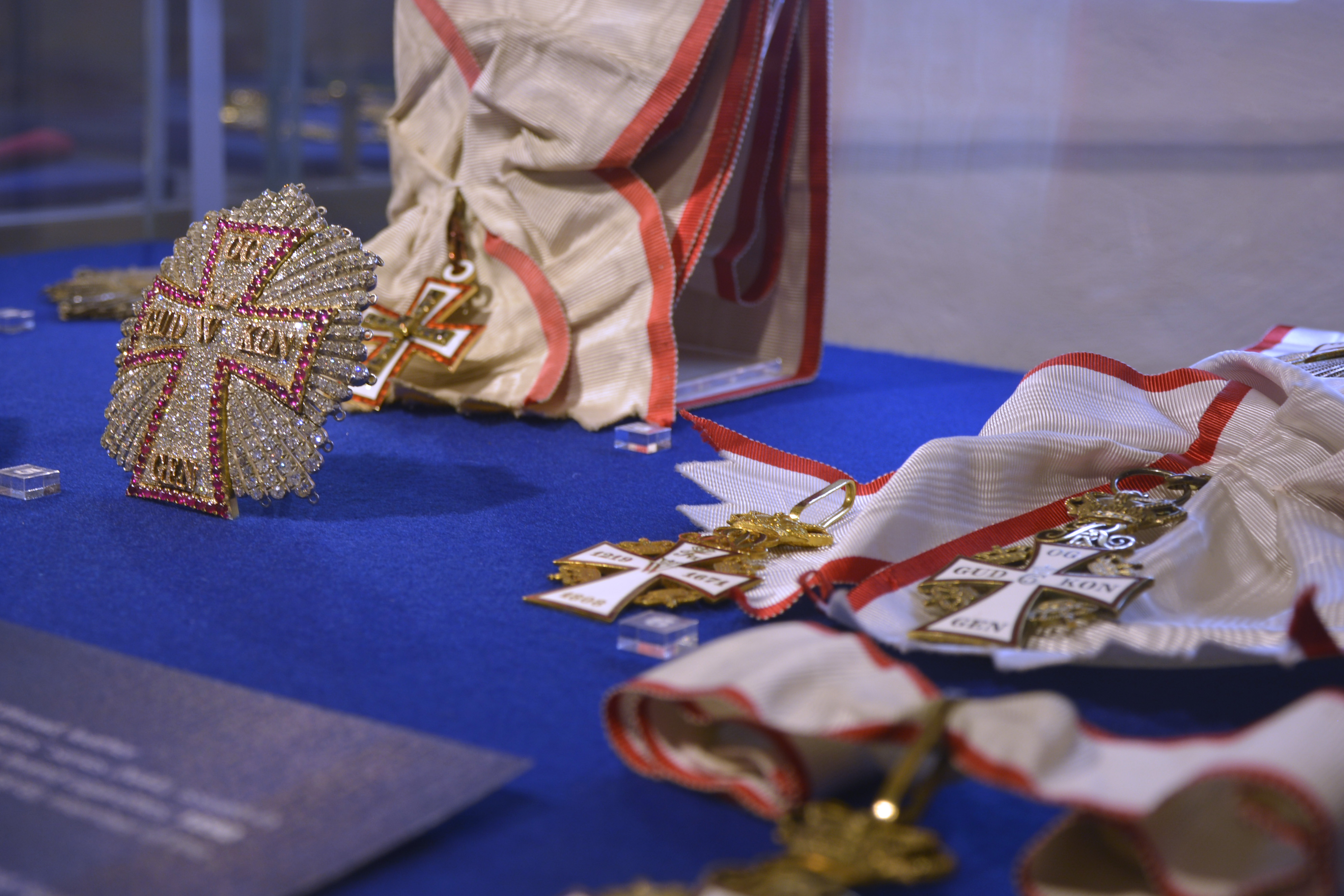
Collection of Orders of the Dannebrog in the Museum of Orders of Chivalry in Tallinn, Estonia

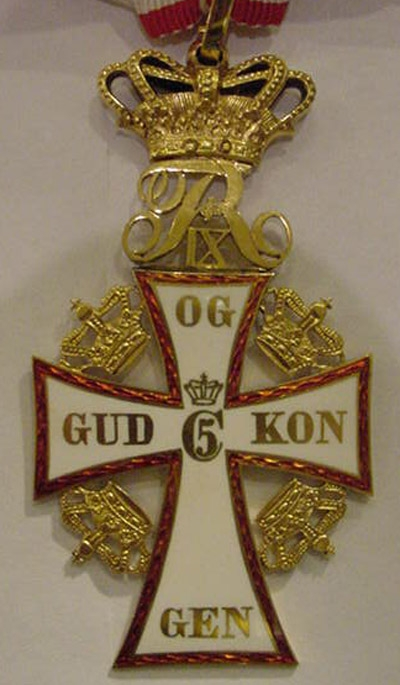
Commander Class from the reign of King Frederik IX

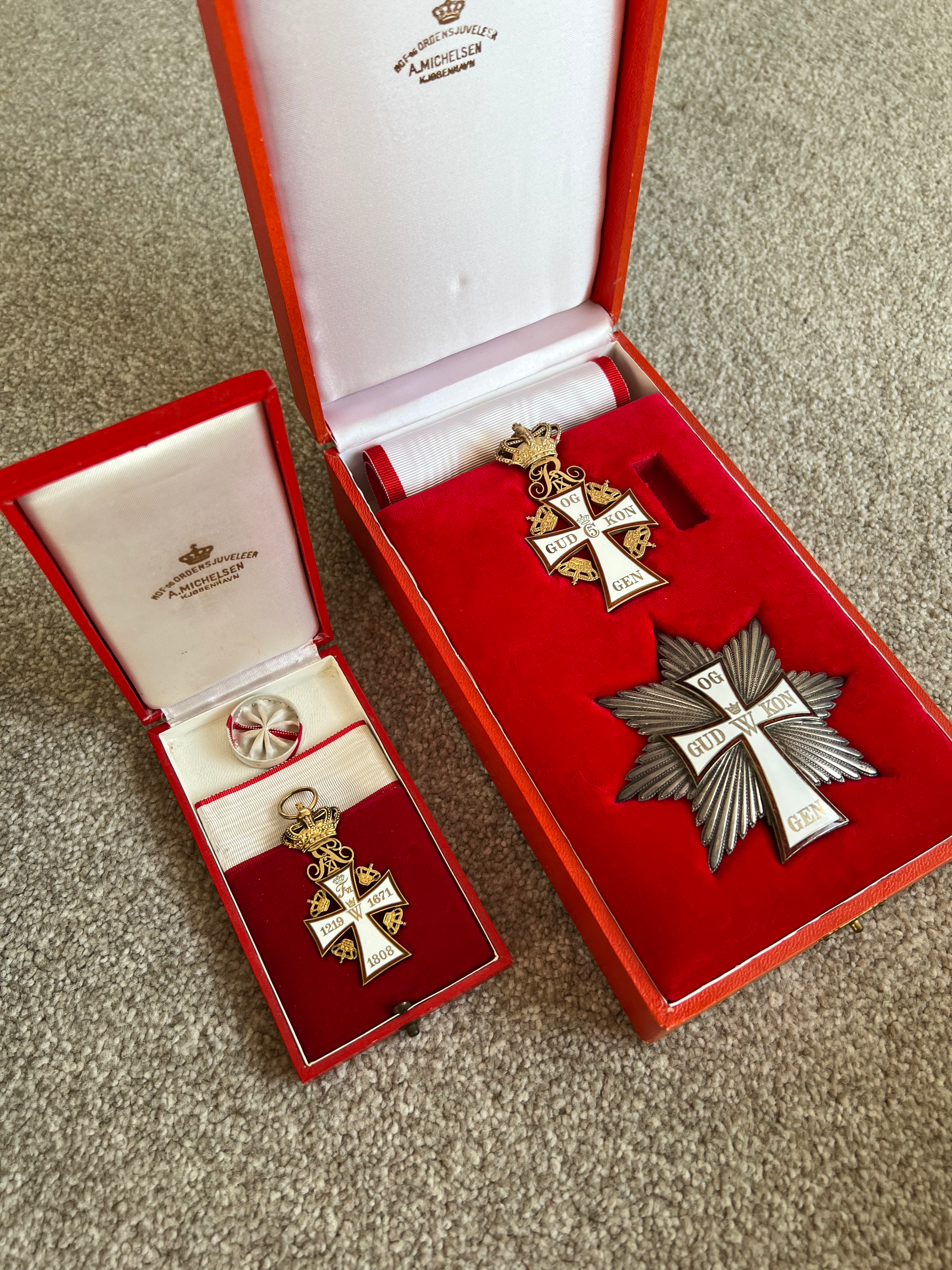
Grand Cross and knight 1st Class of the order

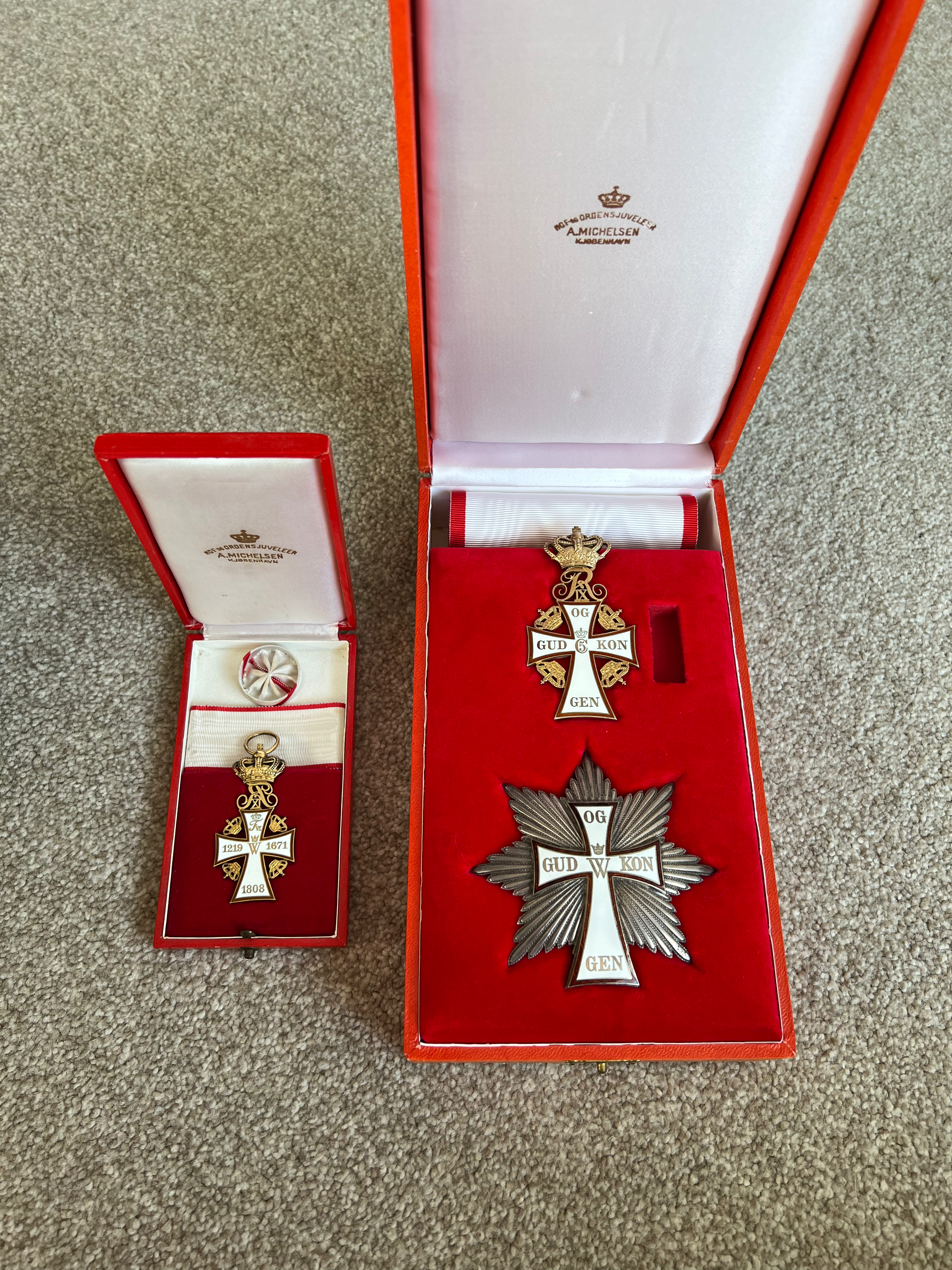
Grand Cross and knight 1st Class of the order

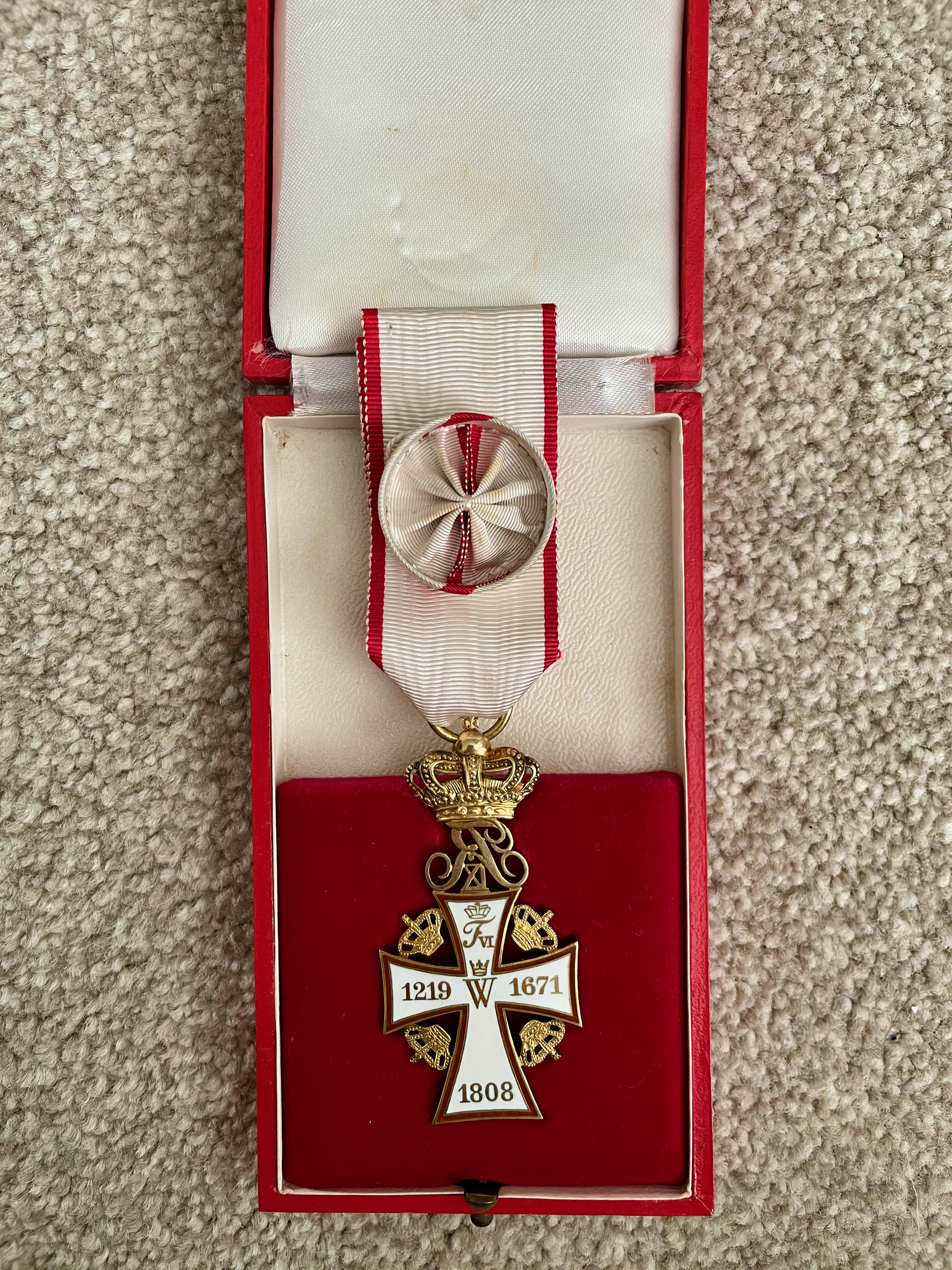
Knight 1st Class set of insignia from the reign of Frederik IX

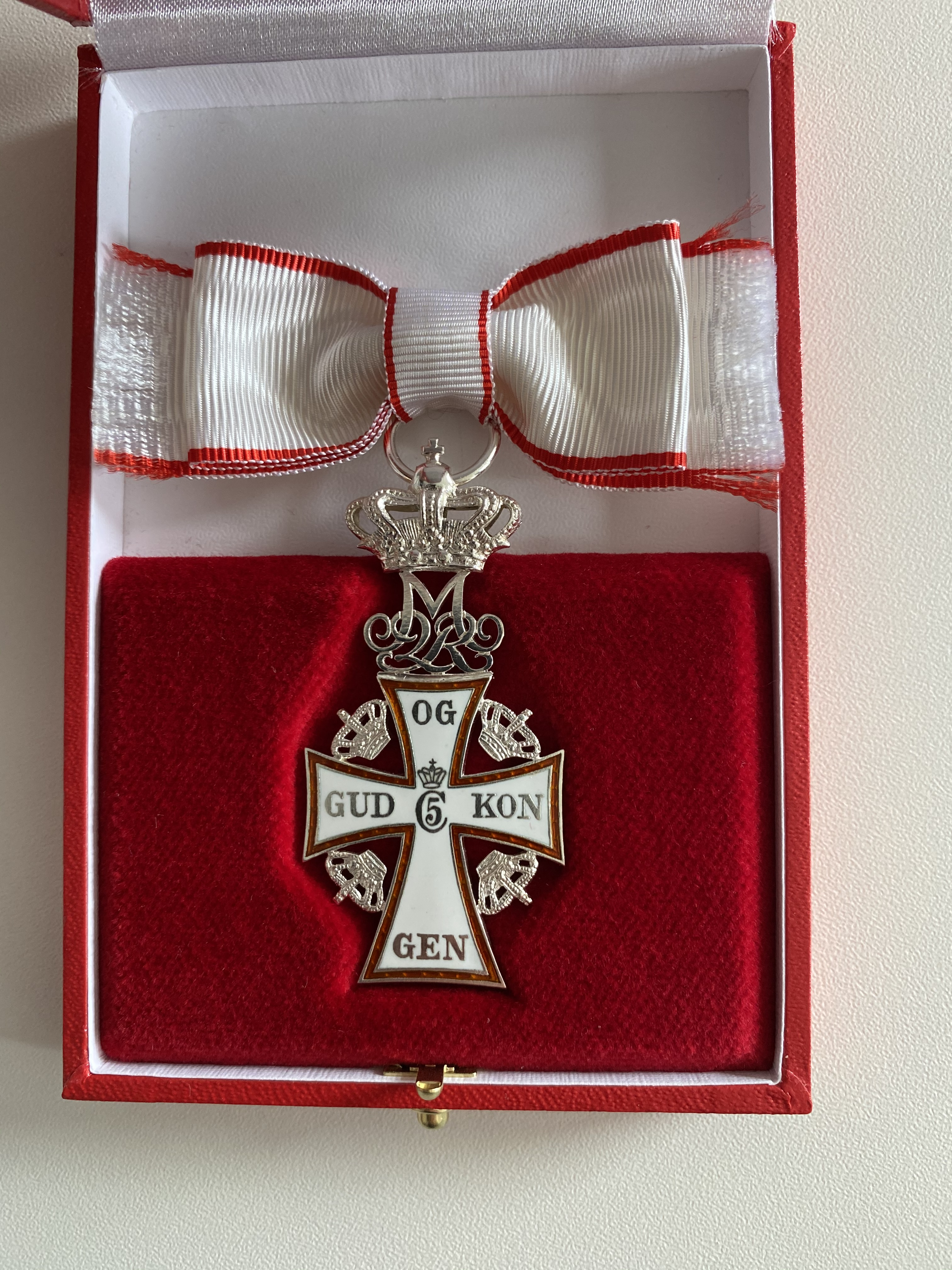
Knights Class from the reign of Margrethe II, Ladies version

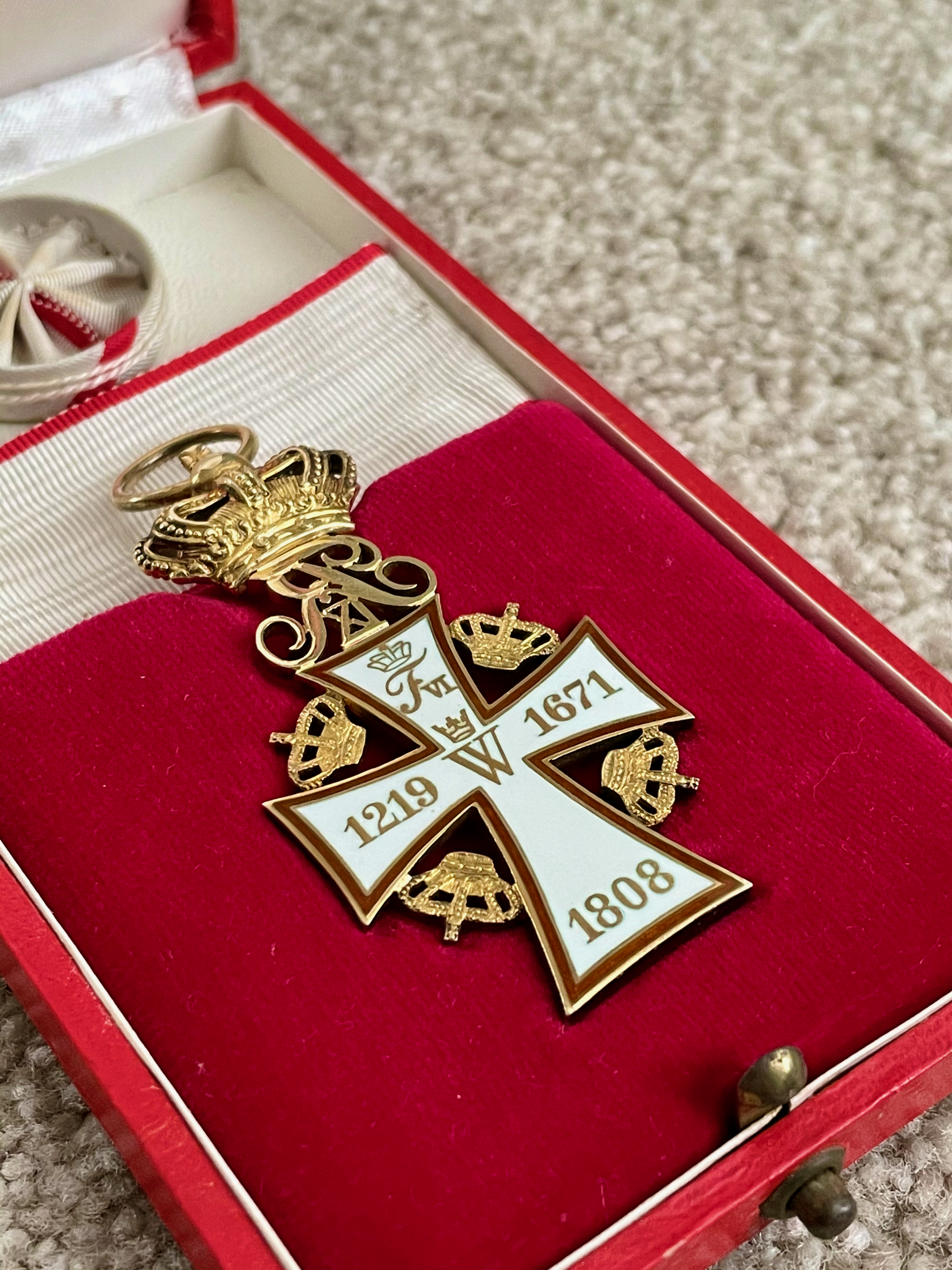
Reverse of a Knight 1st Class badge from the reign of Frederik IX

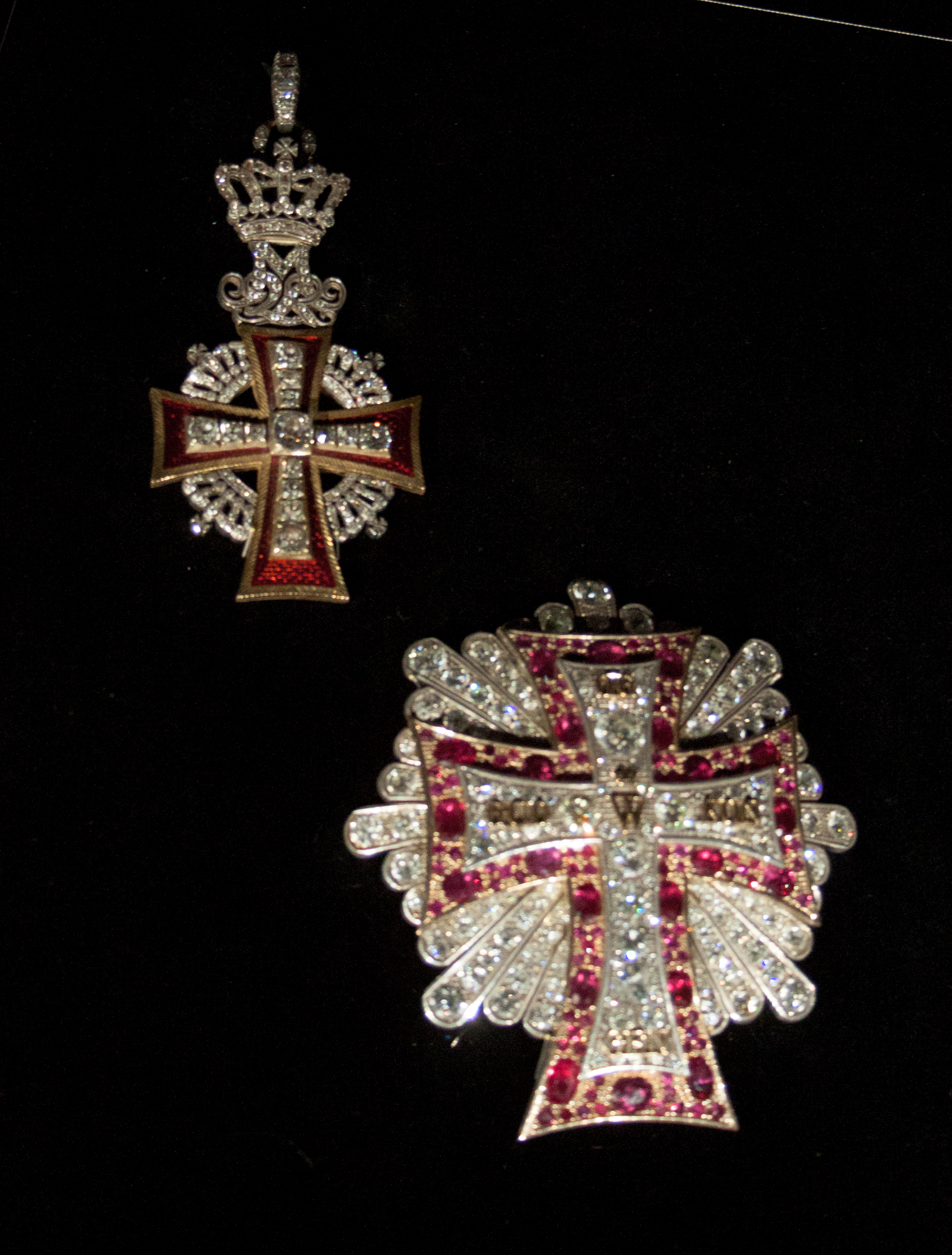
Diamond encrusted set of the Grand Cross grade

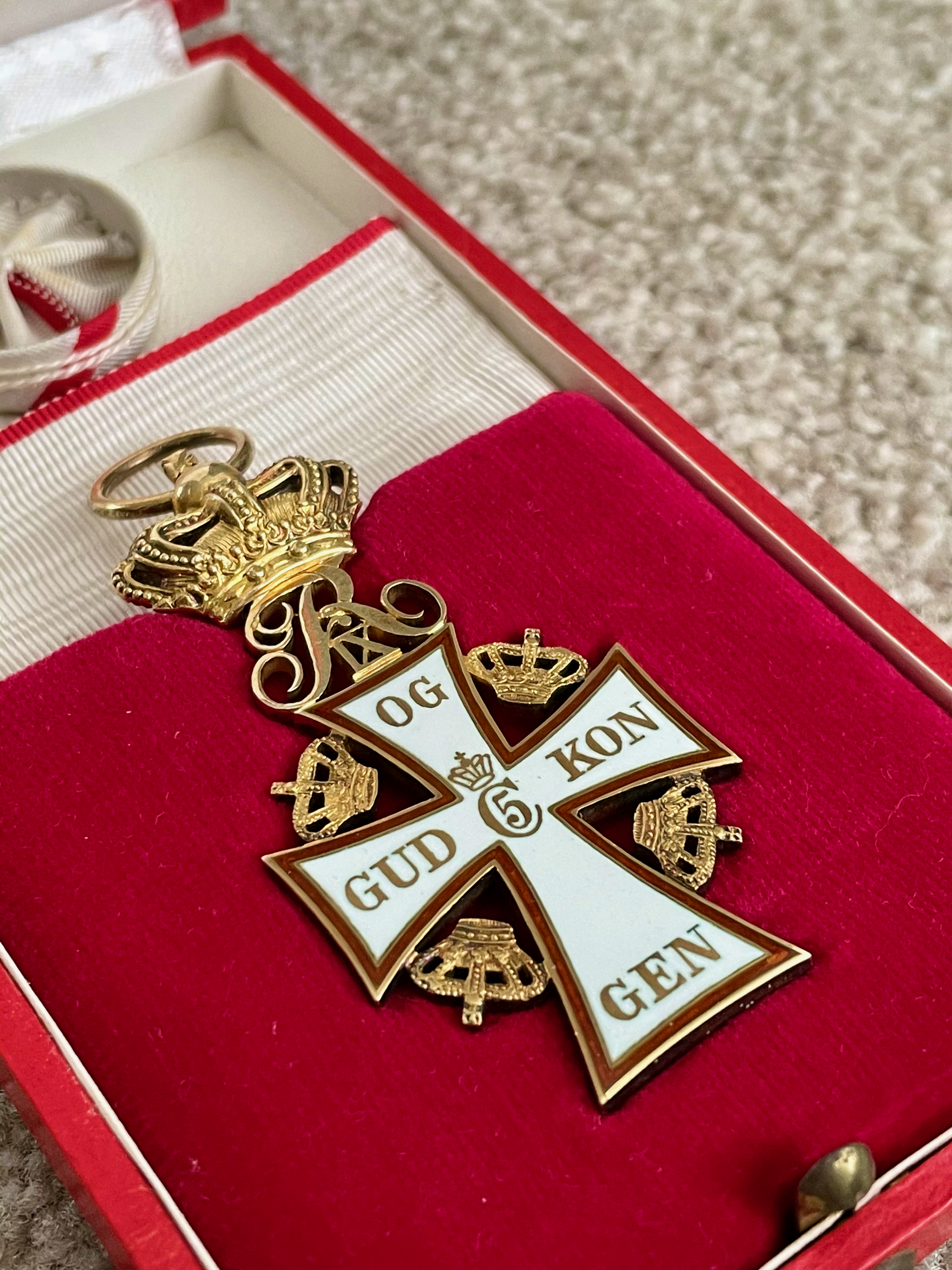
Obverse of a Knight 1st Class badge from the reign of Frederik IX

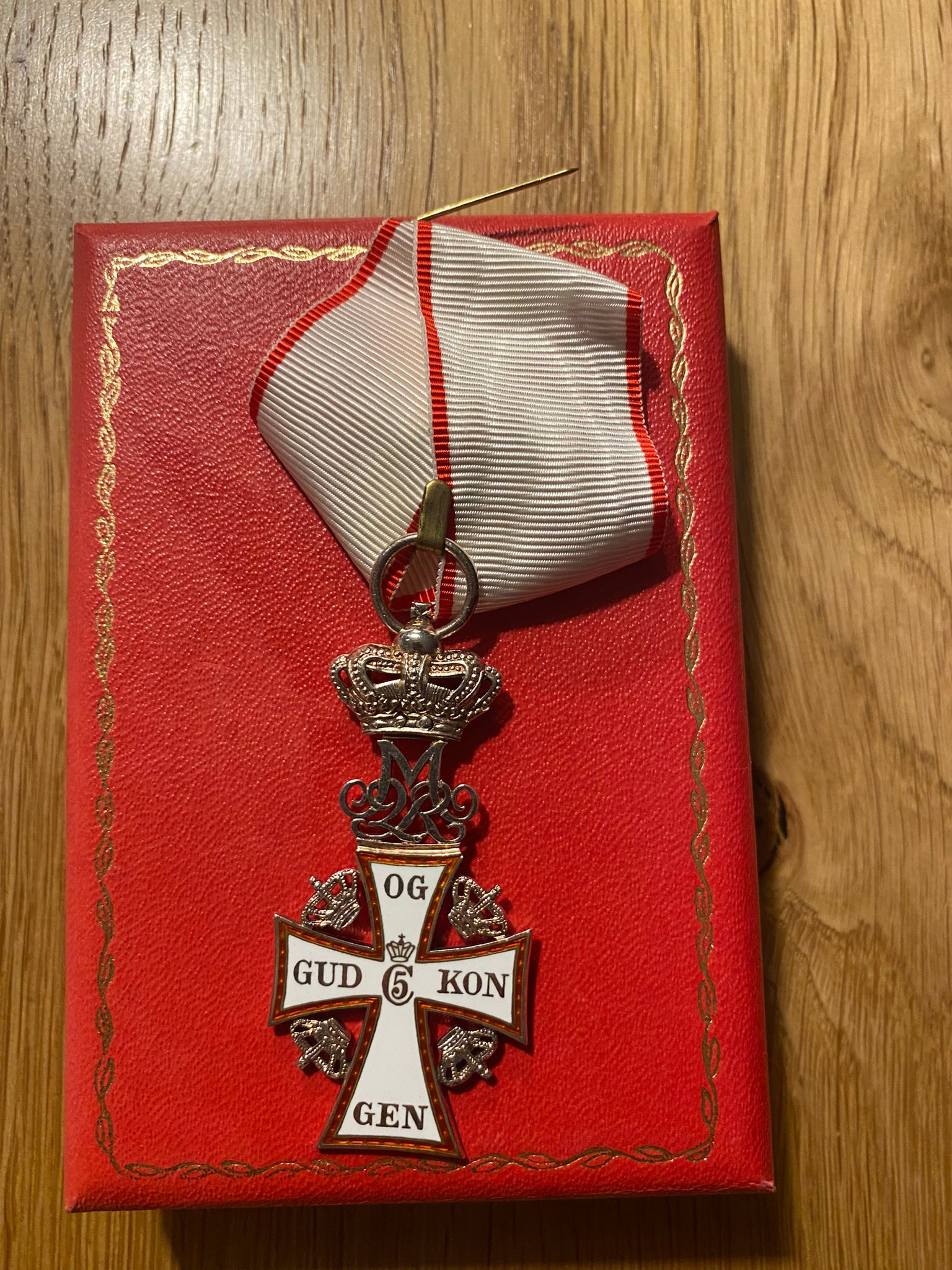
Knights Class set of insignia from the reign of Margrethe II

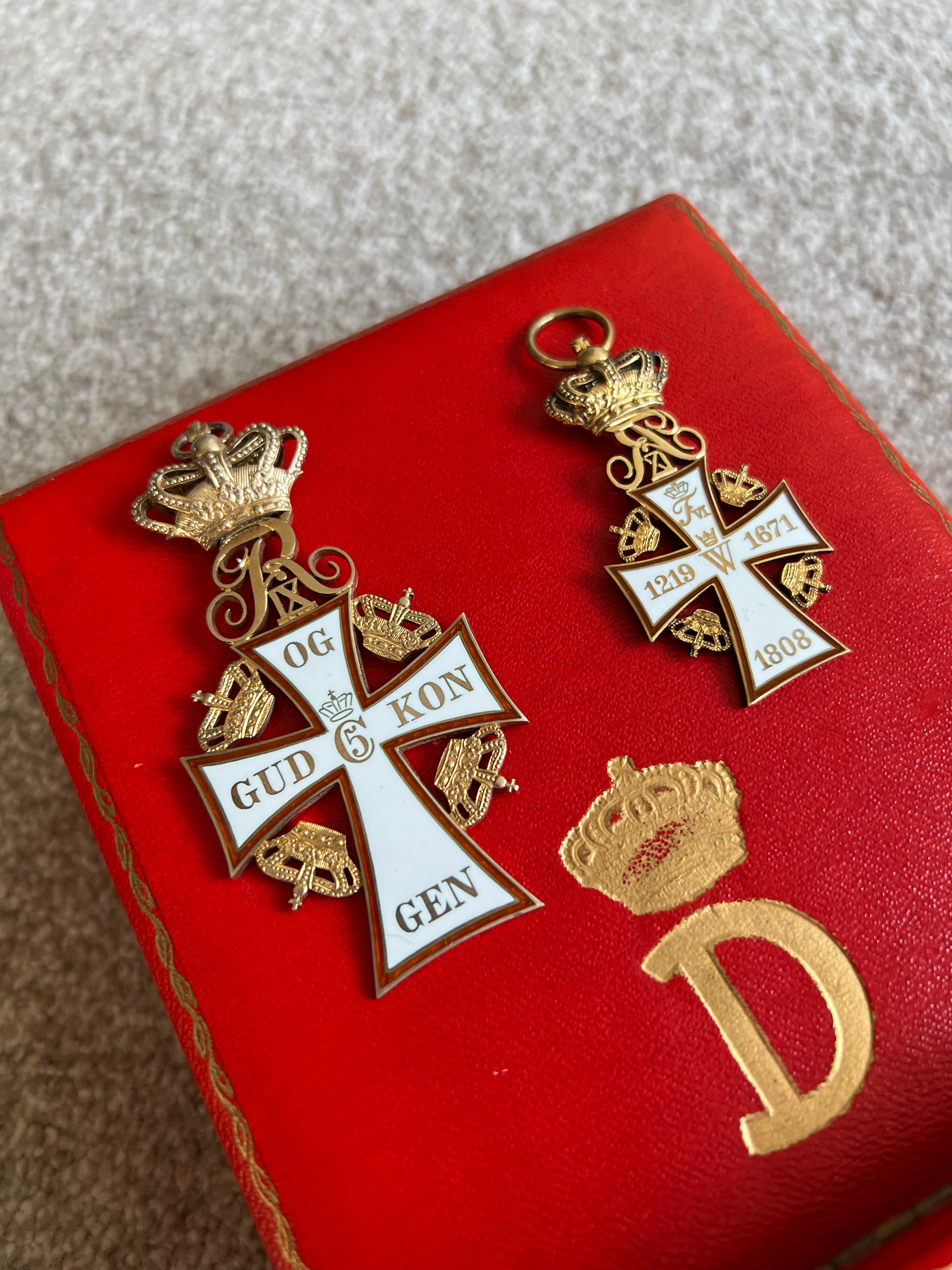
Badges of a Grand Cross and knight 1st Class of the order

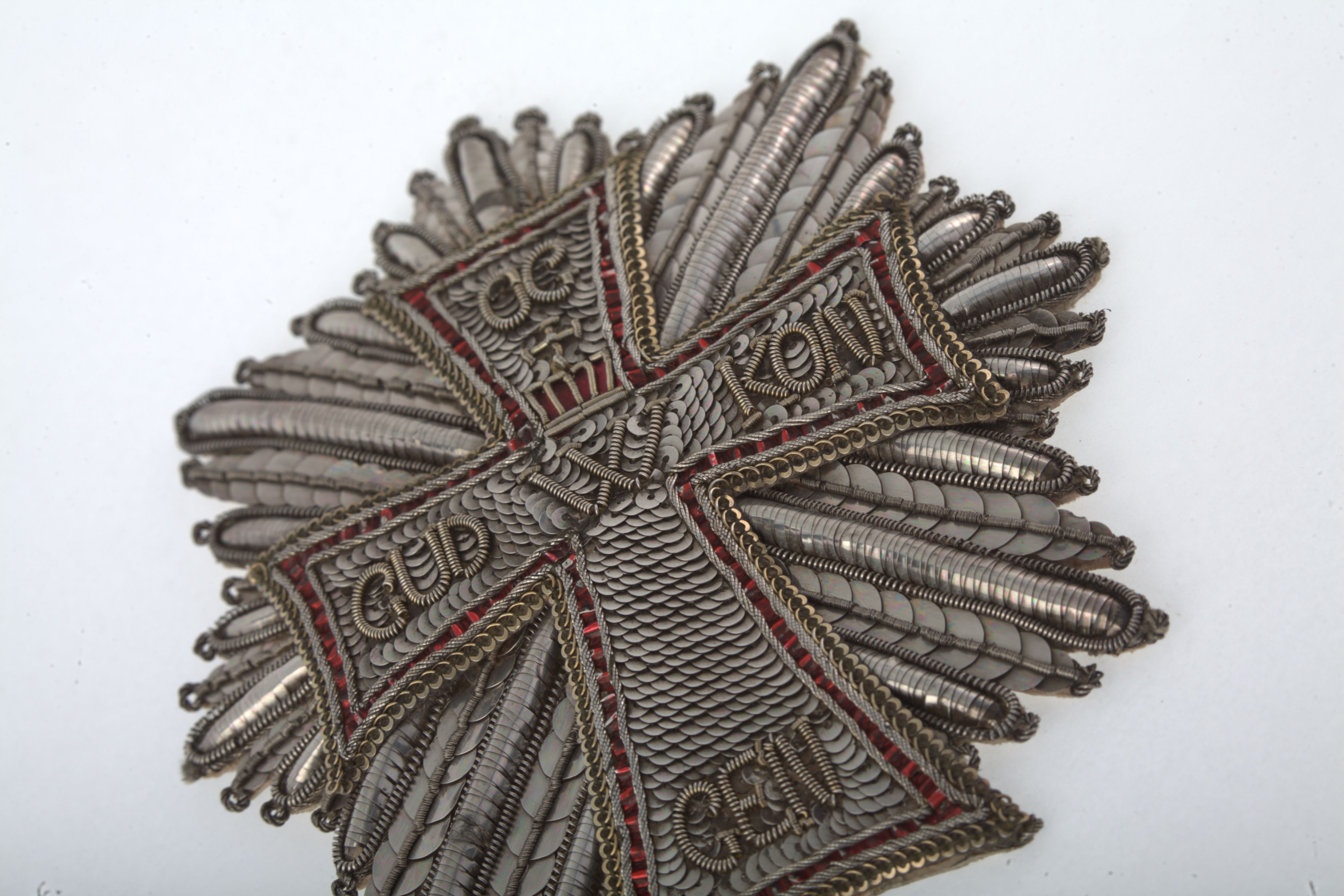
Embroidered Grand Cross Star

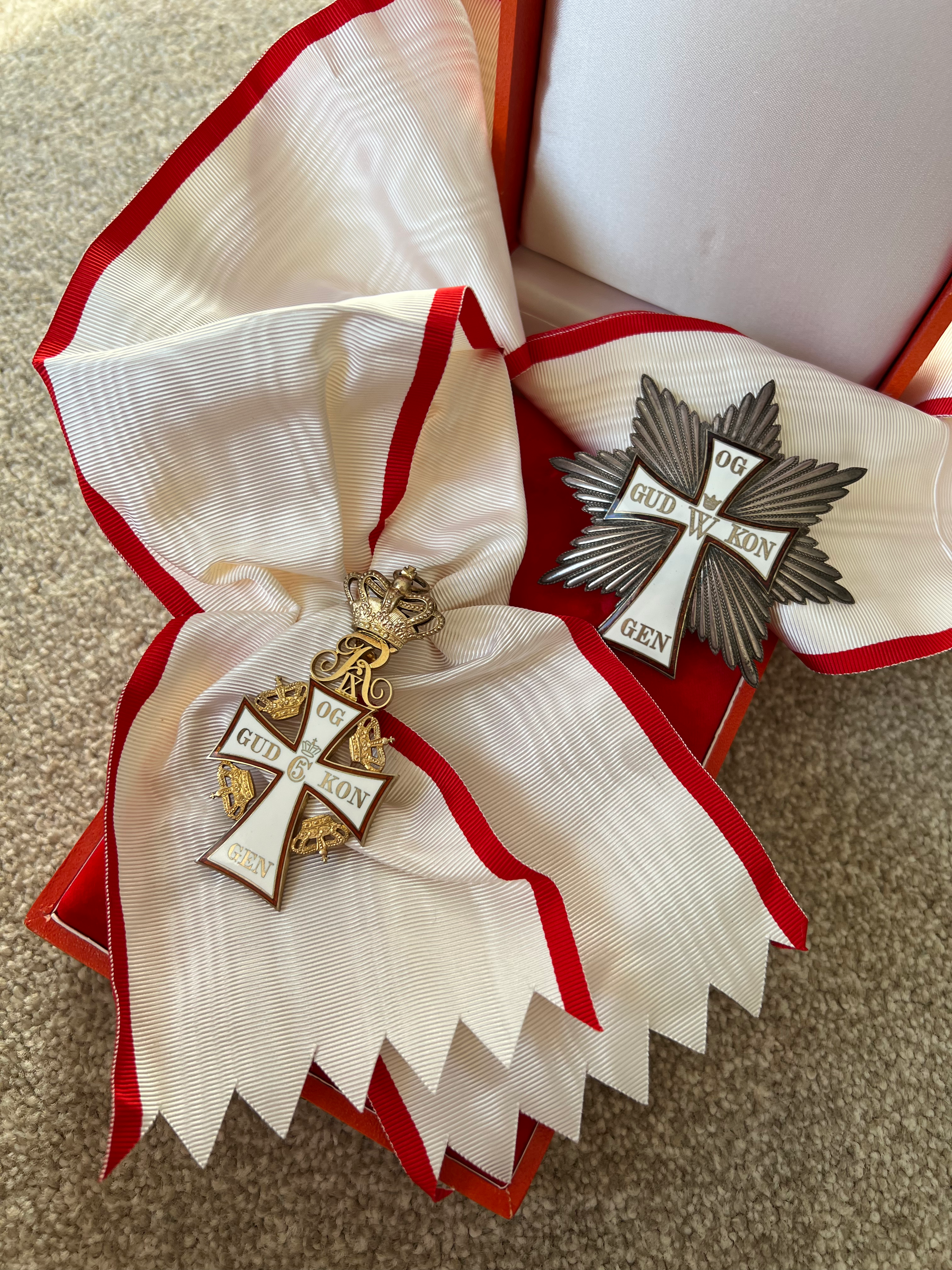
Grand Cross Class of the order from the reign of Frederik IX

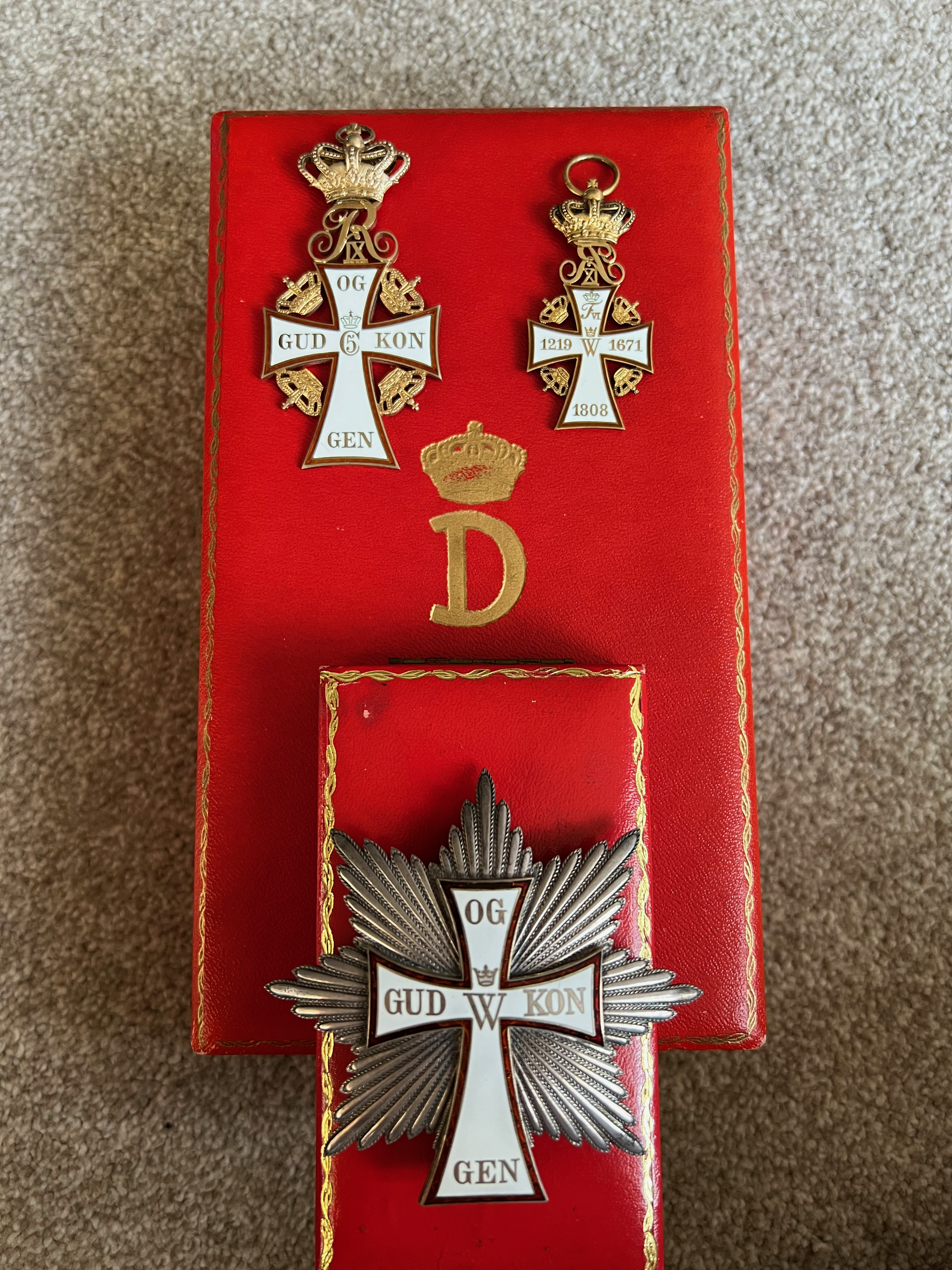
Grand Cross and knight 1st Class of the order

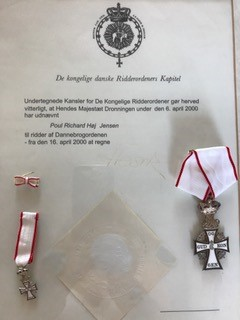
Insignia of the Knights Class with bestowal document, from the reign of Margrethe II

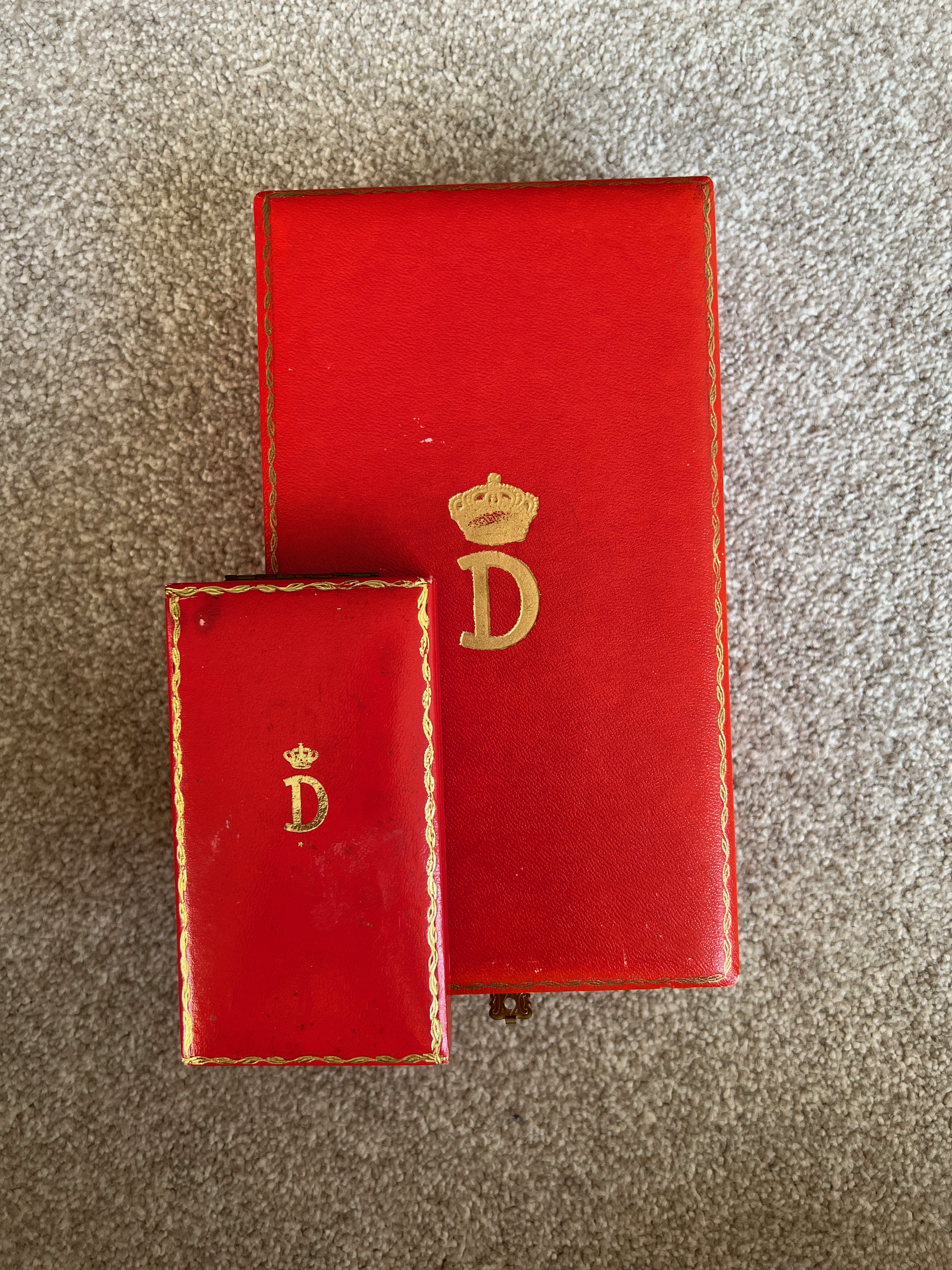
Boxes of the Grand Cross and knight 1st Class of the order

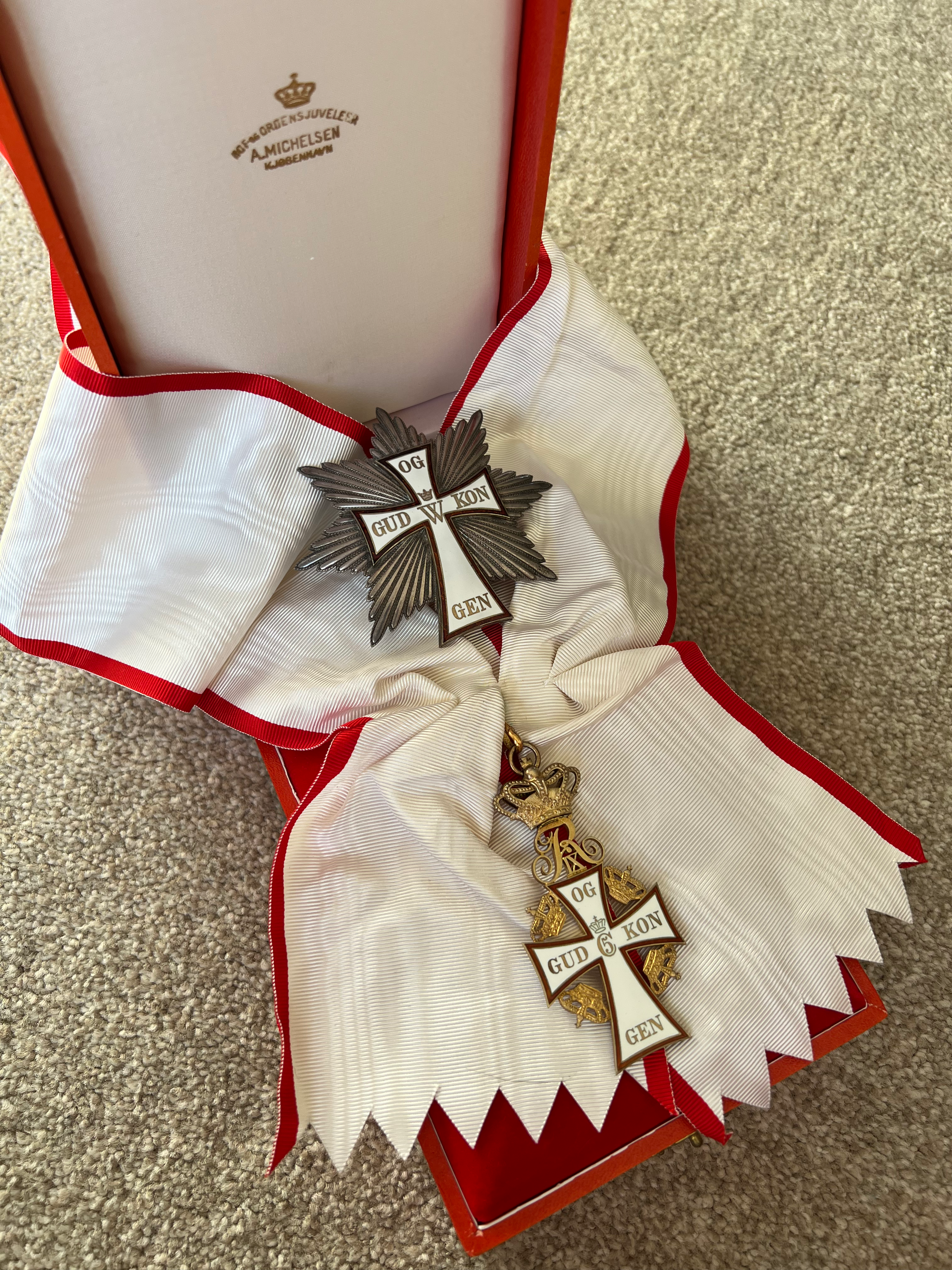
Frederik IX era Grand Cross of the order

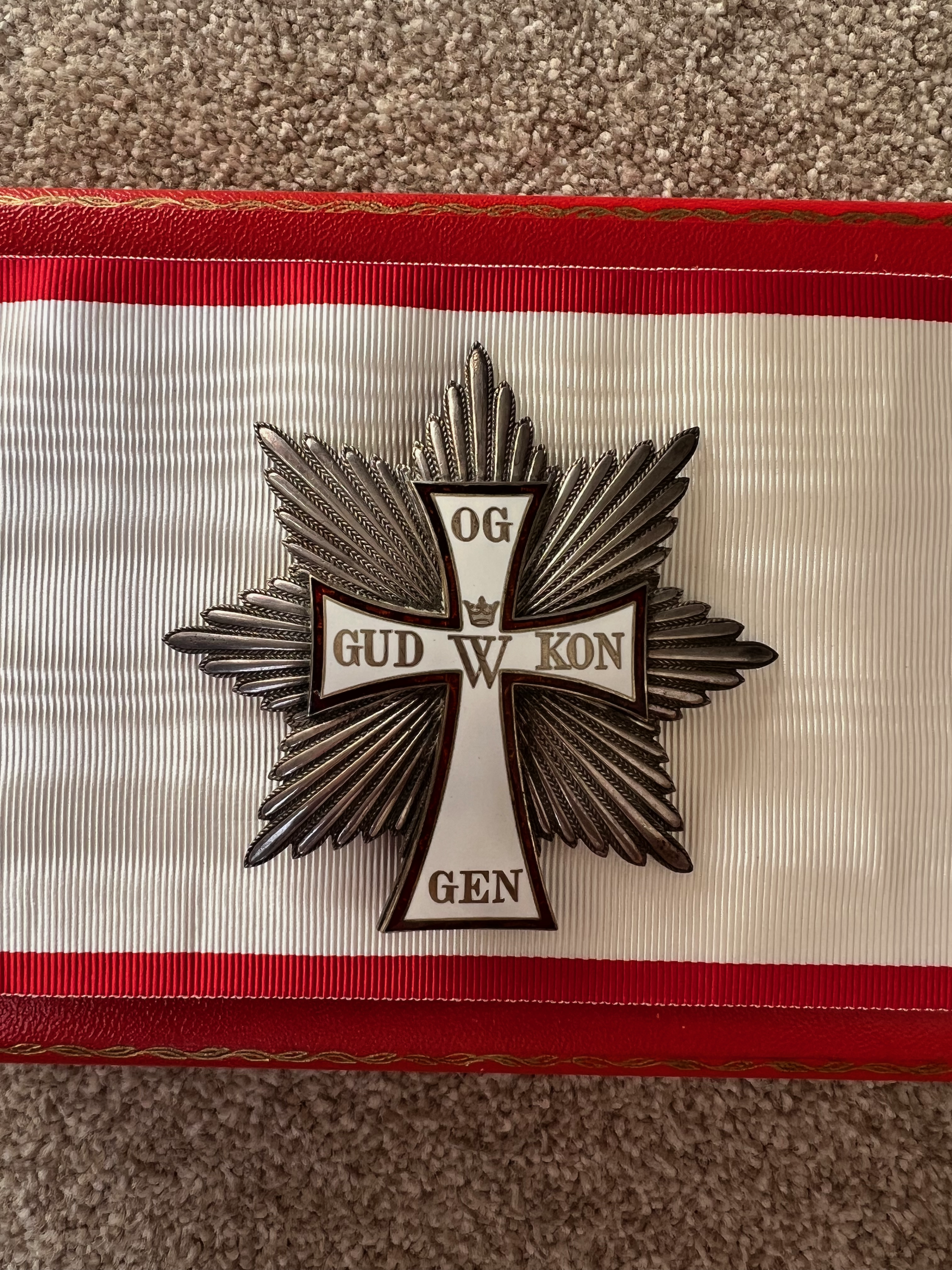
Grand Cross breast star of the order from Frederik IX period

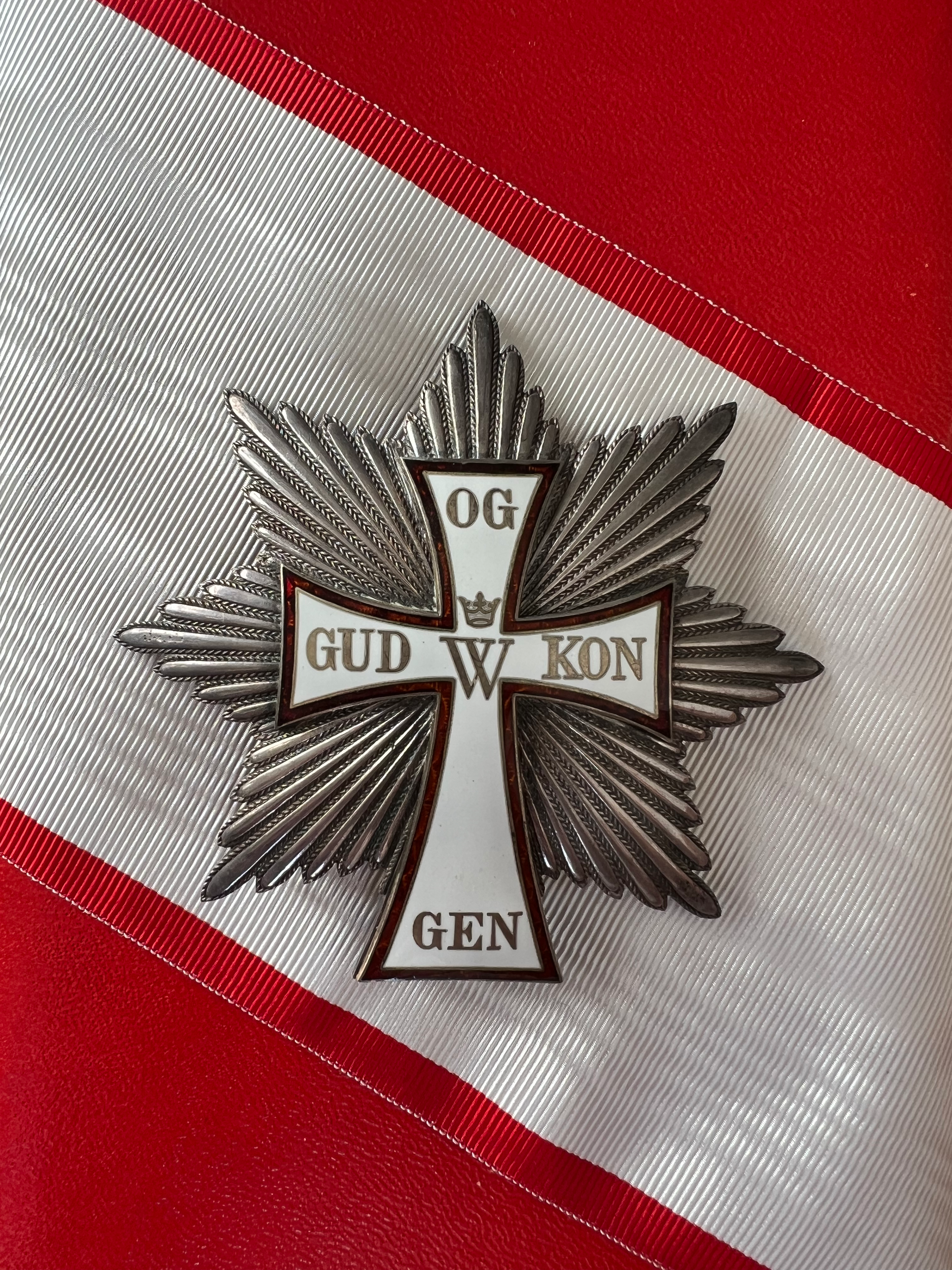
Grand Cross breast star

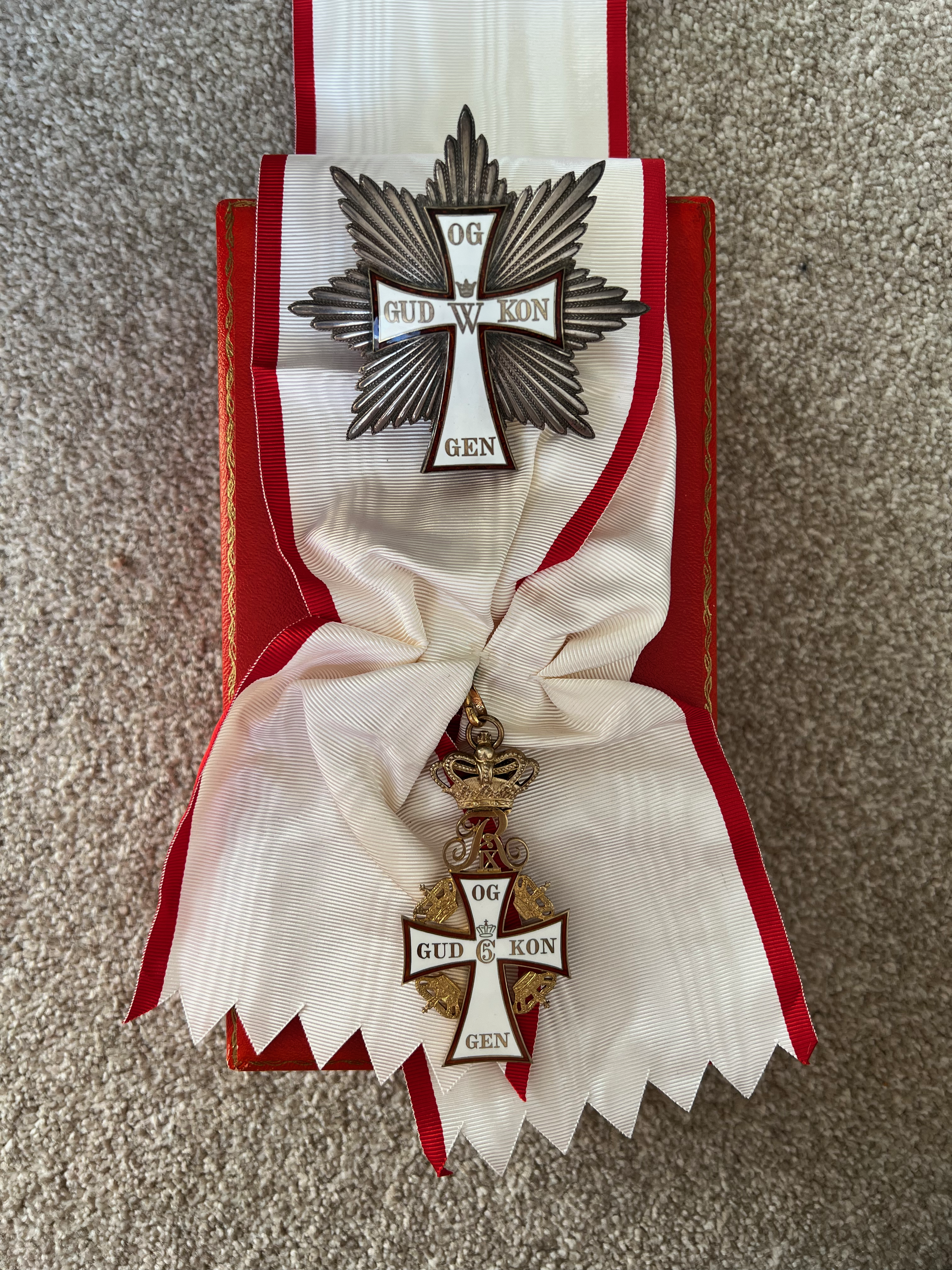
Set of the Grand Cross of the order from the reign of King Frederik IX

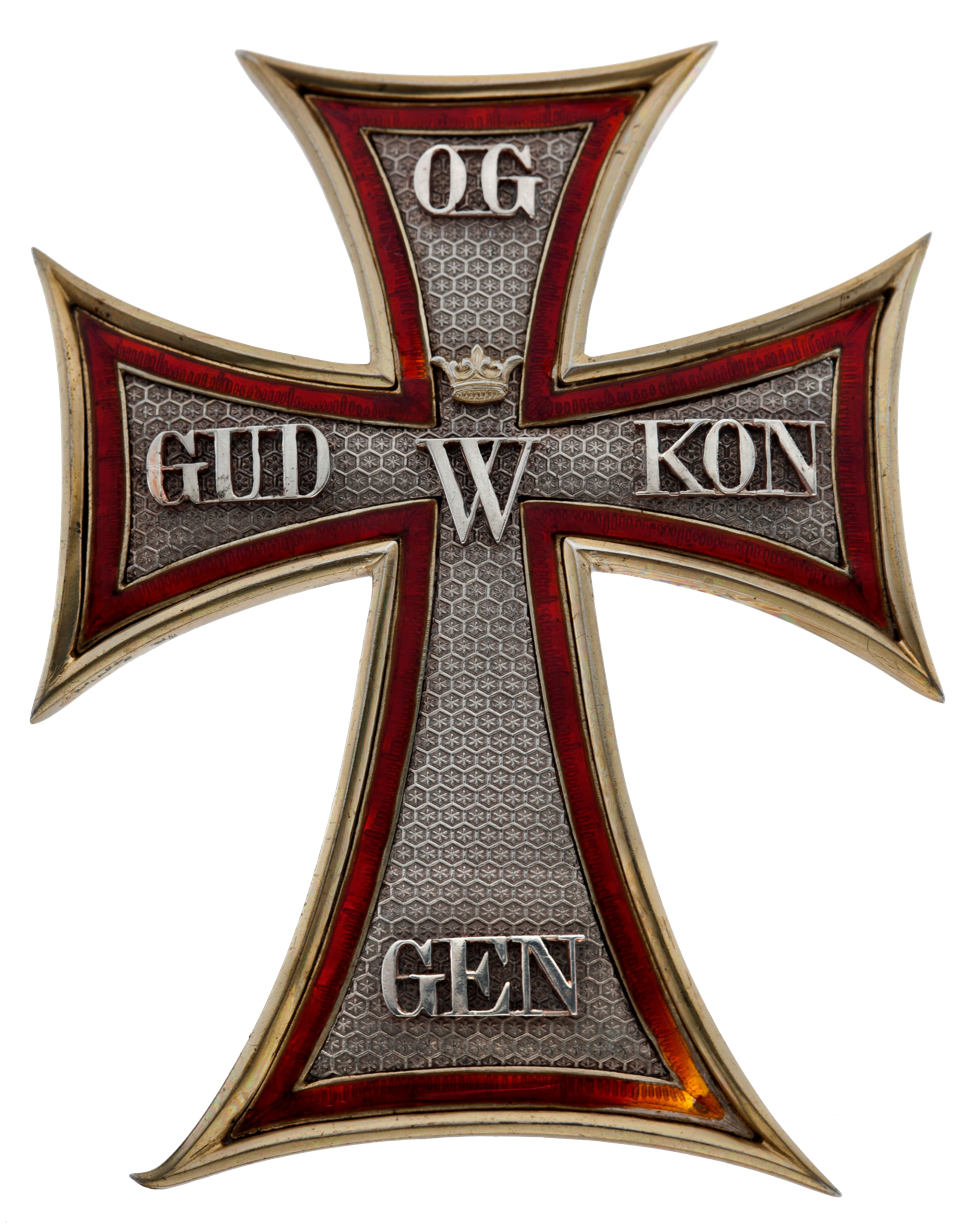
Star of the Commander 1st Class grade of the order

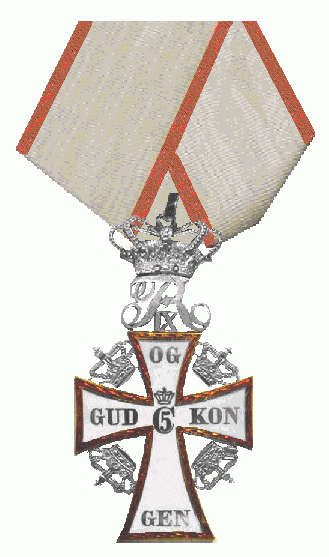
Knight 2nd Class from the reign of King Frederik IX

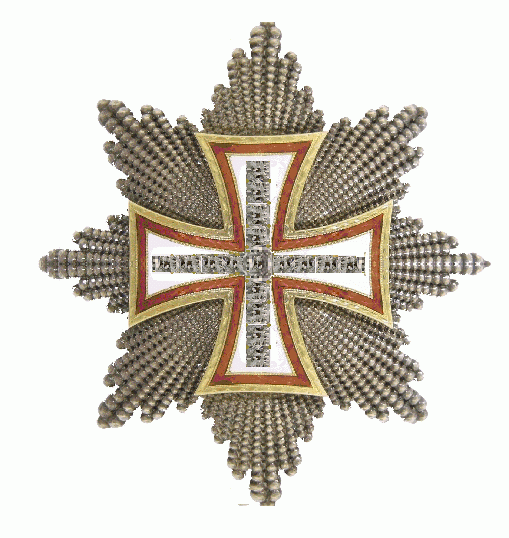
Grand Cross breast star studded with diamonds

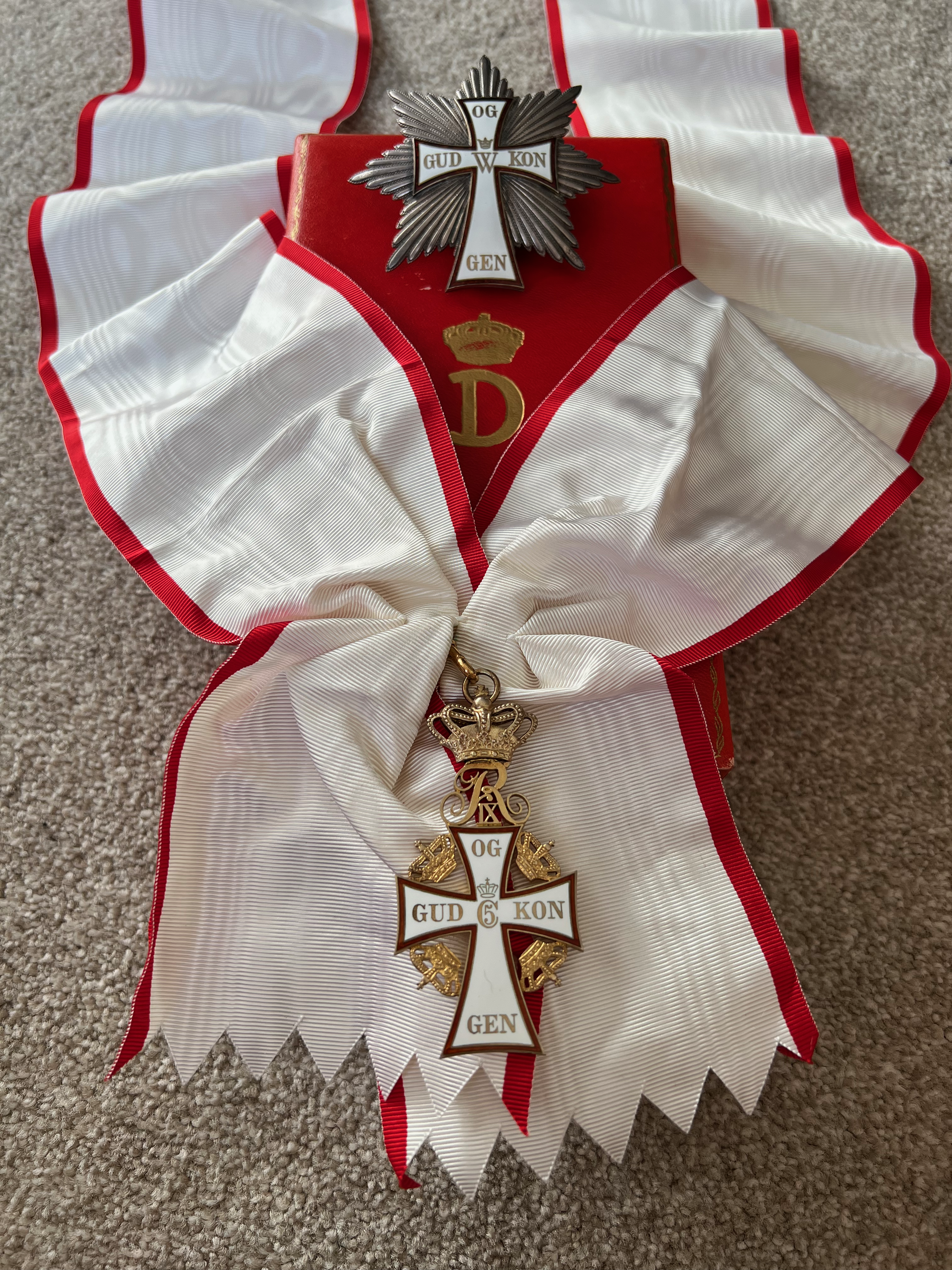
Grand Cross of the order

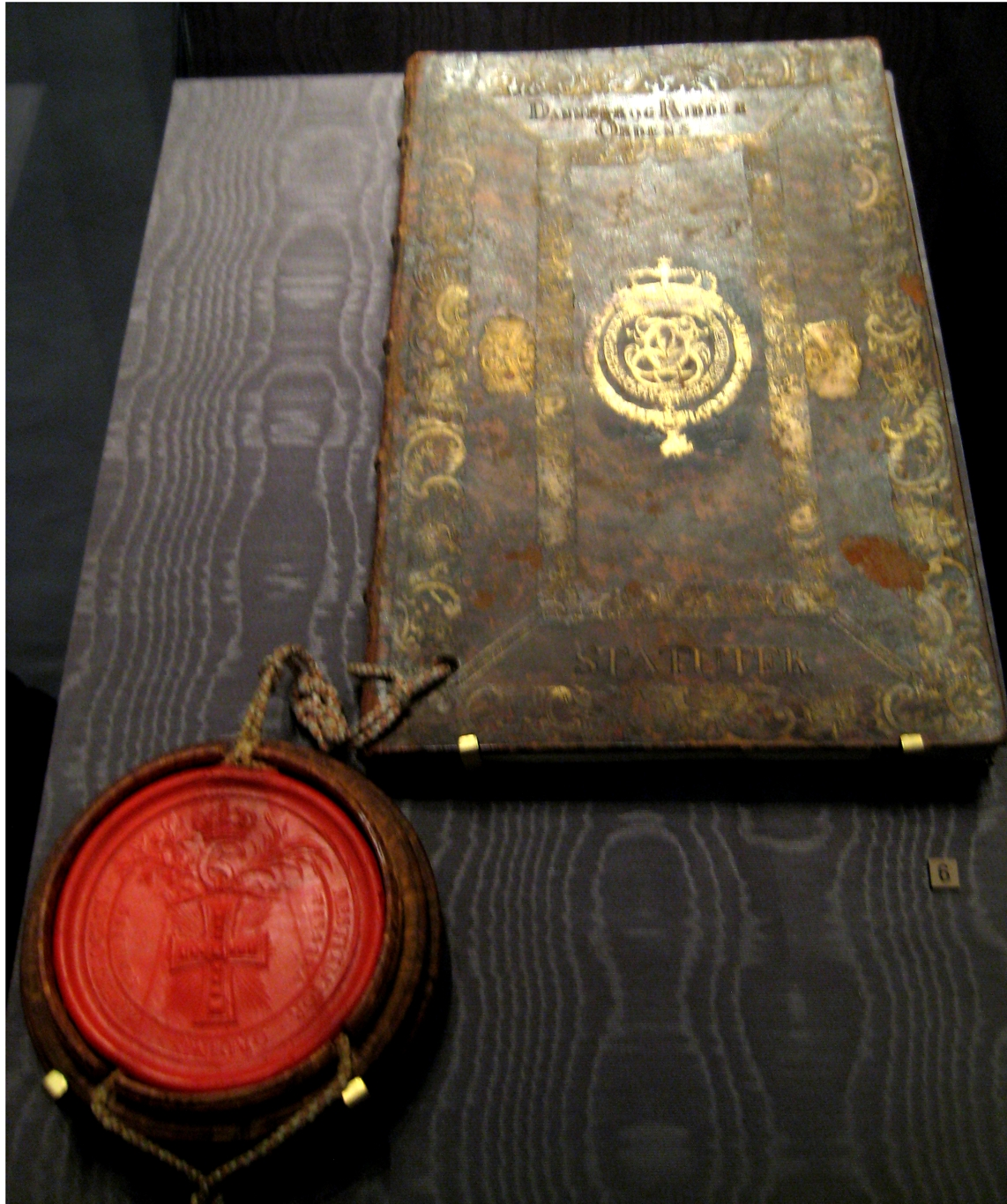
The statutes of the order

== See also ==
- Dannebrogordenens Hæderstegn
- List of grand commanders of the Order of Dannebrog
- List of orders, decorations, and medals of the Kingdom of Denmark
- Order of the Elephant
- Order of the British Empire, roughly equivalent British honour
- Queen Alexandra's Royal Army Nursing Corps
