= List of grand commanders of the Order of Dannebrog =

Grand commanders of the Order of the Dannebrog have been appointed by the Sovereign of the Royal Danish Orders of Chivalry, i.e. the Danish monarch, since the general reorganization of the order by royal letters patent of June 28, 1808. The grand commanders form a special class above the three ordinary classes of the Order of the Dannebrog. Thus, they outrank the Knights Grand Cross of the Dannebrog. Together with the knights of the Order of the Elephant, grand commanders constitute the Chapter of the Royal Danish Orders of Chivalry.

Grand commanders are, or have been, either

- prominent members of the Danish royal family,
- kings and emperors related to the Danish monarch, or,
- other close relations of royal or princely status who are not members of the Danish royal family

Presently seven persons wear the grand commander's insignia. They are the six grand commanders and King Frederik X, the sovereign of the order. There are only eight insignias available. By royal ordinance of October 10, 1951 women can be appointed grand commanders. Therefore, the women that appear in the list before that date were, strictly speaking, not appointed grand commanders as much as awarded the honour of wearing the insignia of a grand commander.

== Grand commanders of the Order of the Dannebrog ==
| Nr | Date | Image | Name | Title | Country | Motto | Notes |
Frederik VI (1768–1839), the founder
| 1 | 28 June 1808 | | Frederik VI of Denmark | King of Denmark (1808–39); King of Norway (1808–14) | Denmark; Norway | God and the just cause (Danish: Gud og den retfærdige sag) | |
| 2 | 14 December 1808 | | Christian August of Schleswig-Holstein-Sønderburg-Augustenborg | Governor-General of Norway (1809–10); Crown Prince of Sweden (1810) | Denmark; Norway; Sweden | | |
| 3 | 16 December 1813 | | Prince Frederik of Hesse-Cassel | Governor-General of Norway (1809–10) | Denmark; Hesse | | Brother-in-law and first cousin of Frederik VI |
| 4 | 10 September 1817 | | Prince Carl of Hesse-Kassel | Governor-General of Norway (1766–68); Governor of Schleswig-Holstein (1769–1836) | Denmark; Hesse | | Father-in-law of Frederik VI |
| 5 | 28 October 1828 | | Christian VIII of Denmark | Prince and Heir Presumptive of Denmark (1786–1808); King of Norway 1814; King of Denmark (1839–48) | Denmark; Norway | God and the fatherland (Danish: Gud og Fædrelandet) | First cousin of Frederik VI. Appointed while Prince and Heir Presumptive (1808–39) in honour of the Queen's birthday. Appointed Master of the Order upon his succession to the throne. |
Christian VIII (1839–48)
| 6 | 28 January 1840 | | Marie, Dowager Queen of Denmark | Princess of Hesse-Cassel (1767–90); Crown Princess of Denmark (1790–1808); Queen consort of Denmark (1808–39); Queen consort of Norway (1808–14); Dowager Queen of Denmark (1839–52) | Denmark; Hesse; Norway | | Widow of King Frederik VI. Only awarded insignia. |
| 7 | 10 June 1841 | | Frederik VII of Denmark | Prince of Denmark (1808–39); Crown Prince of Denmark (1839–48); King of Denmark (1848–63) | Denmark | The people's love, my strength (Danish: Folkets Kærlighed, min Styrke) | Son of Christian VIII. Appointed while Crown Prince (1808–48) in honour of his wedding to Duchess Caroline Mariane of Mecklenburg. Appointed Master of the Order upon his succession to the throne. |
Frederik VII (1848–63)
| 8 | 1 August 1854 | | Ferdinand, Hereditary Prince of Denmark | Prince of Denmark (1792–1863); Heir Presumptive of Denmark (1848–63) | Denmark | | Brother of Christian VIII. Appointed while Heir Presumptive. Died four months before his nephew. |
| 9 | 10 June 1860 | | Carl XV & IV of Sweden and Norway | Duke of Skåne (1826–72); Crown Prince of Sweden and Norway (1844–59); King of Sweden and Norway (1859–72) | Sweden; Norway | | Father-in-law of Frederik VIII |
| 10 | 10 November 1860 | | Vilhelm, Landgrave of Hesse-Cassel | Prince of Hesse-Cassel (1787–1837); Landgrave of Hesse-Cassel (1837–67) | Hesse | | Brother-in-law of Christian VIII and father-in-law of Christian IX. |
Christian IX (1863–1906)
| 11 | 15 November 1863 | | Christian IX of Denmark | Prince of Schleswig-Holstein-Sonderburg-Glücksburg (1825–53); Prince of Denmark (1853–63); King of Denmark (1863–1906) | Denmark | With God for honour and justice (Danish: Med Gud for ære og ret) | Didn't become Grand Commander till he succeeded to the throne. Upon his succession, he also became Master of the Order. |
| 12 | 15 July 1865 | | Caroline Amalie, Dowager Queen of Denmark | Princess of Schleswig-Holstein-Sonderburg-Augustenburg (1796–1881); Princess of Denmark (1815–39); Queen consort of Denmark (1839–48); Dowager Queen of Denmark (1848–81) | Denmark | | Widow of Christian VIII. Only awarded insignia. |
| 13 | 28 July 1869 | | Frederick VIII of Denmark | Prince of Schleswig-Holstein-Sonderburg-Glücksburg (1843–53); Prince of Denmark (1853–63); Crown Prince of Denmark (1863–1906); King of Denmark (1906–12) | Denmark | The Lord is my aid (Danish: Herren er min hjælper) | Son of Christian IX. Appointed while Crown Prince (1863–1906) in honour of his wedding to Louise of Sweden. Appointed Master of the Order upon his succession to the throne. |
| 14 | 30 June 1871 | | George I of Greece | Prince of Schleswig-Holstein-Sonderburg-Glücksburg (1845–53); Prince of Denmark (1853–1913); The King of the Hellenes (1863–1913) | Denmark; Greece | | Son of Christian IX. |
| 15 | 7 September 1883 | | Queen Louise of Denmark | Princess of Hesse-Cassel (1817–42); Princess of Schleswig-Holstein-Sonderburg-Glücksburg (1842–53); Princess of Denmark (1853–63); Queen consort of Denmark (1863–98) | Denmark; Hesse | | Consort of Christian IX. Only awarded insignia. Appointed in honour of her 66th birthday. |
| 16 | 9 November 1891 | | Alexander III of Russia | Grand Duke of Russia (1845–65); Tsesarevich of Russia (1865–81); Emperor of Russia (1881–94) | Russia | | Son-in-law of Christian IX. Appointed in honour of his and Dagmar of Denmark's 25th wedding anniversary. |
| 17 | 26 November 1894 | | Nicholas II of Russia | Grand Duke of Russia (1868–81); Tsesarevich of Russia (1881–94); Emperor of Russia (1894–1917) | Russia | | Grandson of Christian IX. Appointed when he succeeded to the Russian throne. |
| 18 | 21 July 1900 | | Prince Valdemar of Denmark | Prince of Denmark (1858–1939) | Denmark | | Son of Christian IX. |
| 19 | 9 September 1901 | | Edward VII of the United Kingdom | Duke of Cornwall (1841–1901); Prince of Wales (1841–1901); King of the United Kingdom (1901–11) | United Kingdom | | Son-in-law of Christian IX. |
Christian X (1912–47)
| 20 | 14 May 1912 | | Christian X of Denmark | Prince of Denmark (1870–1906); Crown Prince of Denmark (1906–12); King of Denmark (1912–47); King of Iceland (1918–44) | Denmark; Iceland | My God, my country, my honour (Danish: Min Gud, mit land, min ære) | Didn't become Grand Commander till he succeeded to the throne. Upon his succession, he also became Master of the Order. |
| 21 | 14 May 1912 | | Haakon VII of Norway | Prince of Denmark (1872–1905); King of Norway (1905–57) | Denmark; Norway | | Brother of Christian X. |
| 22 | 28 March 1913 | | Constantine I of Greece | Prince of Greece (1868–1913); Prince of Denmark (1868–1923); King of the Hellenes (1913–17, 1920–22) | Greece; Denmark | | First cousin of Christian X. Appointed upon his succession to the throne. |
| 23 | 18 April 1913 | | George V of the United Kingdom | Prince of the United Kingdom 1865–1910; Duke of York (1892–1910); Duke of Cornwall and Rothesay (1901–10); Prince of Wales (1901–10); King of the United Kingdom (1910–36) | United Kingdom | | First cousin of Christian X. |
| 24 | 10 July 1920 | | Prince George of Greece and Denmark | Prince of Greece and Denmark (1869–1957); High Commissioner of Crete (1898–1906) | Greece; Denmark | | First cousin of Christian X. |
| 25 | 3 February 1936 | | Frederik IX of Denmark | Prince of Denmark (1899–1912); Crown Prince of Denmark (1912–47); Crown Prince of Iceland (1918–44); King of Denmark (1947–72) | Denmark; Iceland | With God for Denmark (Danish: Med Gud for Danmark) | Son of Christian X. Appointed while Crown Prince (1912–47). |
| 26 | 15 May 1937 | | Knud, Hereditary Prince of Denmark | Prince of Denmark (1900–53); Hereditary Prince of Denmark (1953–76) | Denmark | | Son of Christian X. |
| 27 | 1945 | | Gustaf V of Sweden | Duke of Värmland (1858–1907); Prince of Sweden and Norway (1858–72); Crown Prince of Sweden (1872–1907); Crown Prince of Norway (1872–1905); King of Sweden (1907–50) | Sweden | | Grandfather of Christian X's daughter-in-law Ingrid of Sweden. |
| 28 | 26 March 1947 | | Prince Axel of Denmark | Prince of Denmark (1888–1964) | Denmark | | First cousin of Christian X. |
Frederik IX (1947–72)
| 29 | 26 May 1948 | | Alexandrine, Dowager Queen of Denmark | Duchess of Mecklenburg-Schwerin (1879–98); Princess of Denmark (1898–1906); Crown Princess of Denmark (1906–12); Queen consort of Denmark (1912–47); Dowager Queen of Denmark (1947–52) | Denmark; Mecklenburg-Schwerin | | Consort of Christian X, and mother of Frederik IX. Only awarded insignia. Appointed in honour of the 50th anniversary of her arriving in Denmark. |
| 30 | 8 May 1951 | | George VI of the United Kingdom | Prince of the United Kingdom (1895–1936); Duke of York (1920–36); King of the United Kingdom (1936–52) | United Kingdom | | Second cousin of Frederik IX. |
| 31 | 24 March 1952 | | Gustaf VI Adolf of Sweden | Duke of Skåne (1882–1950); Prince of Sweden (1882–1907); Prince of Norway (1882–1905); Crown Prince of Sweden (1907–50); King of Sweden (1950–73) | Sweden | | Father-in-law of Frederik IX. |
| 32 | 11 September 1958 | | Olav V of Norway | Prince of Denmark (1903–05); Crown Prince of Norway (1905–57); King of Norway (1957–91) | Norway; Denmark | | First cousin of Frederik IX. |
| 33 | 11 March 1959 | | Queen Ingrid of Denmark | Princess of Sweden 1910–2000; Crown Princess of Denmark (1935–47); Crown Princess of Iceland (1935–44); Queen consort of Denmark (1947–72); Dowager Queen of Denmark (1972–2002) | Sweden; Denmark | | Consort of Frederik IX. Appointed in honour of Frederik IX's 50th birthday. Due to royal ordinance in 1951 first woman to be fully appointed Grand Commander. |
| 34 | 29 January 1963 | | Paul of Greece | Prince of Greece (1901–35); Prince of Denmark (1901–64); Crown Prince of Greece (1935–47); King of the Hellenes (1947–64) | Greece; Denmark | | Second cousin of Frederik IX and father of his son-in-law, Constantine II of Greece. Appointed in honour of the engagement between Princess Anne-Marie of Denmark and Crown Prince Constantine of Greece. |
| 35 | 12 March 1964 | | Constantine II of Greece | Prince of Greece (1940–47); Prince of Denmark (1940–2023); Crown Prince of Greece (1947–64); King of the Hellenes (1964–73) | Greece; Denmark | | Son-in-law of Frederik IX. Appointed upon his succession to the throne. |
| 36 | 1968 | | Prince Viggo, Count of Rosenborg | Prince of Denmark (1893–1924); Count of Rosenborg (1924–70) | Denmark | | First cousin once removed of Frederik IX. |
Margrethe II (1972–present)
| 37 | 14 January 1972 | | Margrethe II of Denmark | Princess of Denmark (1940–53); Princess of Iceland (1940–44); Heiress Presumptive of Denmark (1953–72); Queen of Denmark (1972–2024) | Denmark | God's help, the people's love, Denmark's strength (Danish: Guds hjælp, folkets kærlighed, Danmarks styrke) | Didn't become Grand Commander till she succeeded to the throne. Upon her succession, she also became Master of the Order. |
| 38 | 16 April 1973 | | Prince Henrik of Denmark | Prince of Denmark (1967–72); Prince consort of Denmark (1972–2018) | Denmark | | Prince consort of Margrethe II. Appointed in honour of her 33rd birthday. |
| 39 | 10 April 1975 | | Carl XVI Gustaf of Sweden | Duke of Jämtland (1946–1973); Prince of Sweden (1946–50); Crown Prince of Sweden (1950–73); King of Sweden (1973–present) | Sweden | | First cousin of Margrethe II. |
| 40 | 28 October 1991 | | Harald V of Norway | Prince of Norway (1937–57); Crown Prince of Norway (1957–91); King of Norway (1991–2026) | Norway | | Second cousin of Margrethe II. Appointed in connection with the Norwegian state visit to Denmark, his first as monarch, in October 1991. |
| 41 | 27 January 1993 | | Princess Benedikte of Denmark | Princess of Denmark (1944–present); Princess of Sayn-Wittgenstein-Berleburg (1968–2017); Dowager Princess of Sayn-Wittgenstein-Berleburg (2017–present) | Denmark | | Sister of Margrethe II. Appointed in honour of her 25th wedding anniversary. |
| 42 | 1 January 2004 | | Frederik X of Denmark | Prince of Denmark (1968–72); Crown Prince of Denmark (1972–2024); King of Denmark (2024–Present) | Denmark | United, committed, for the Kingdom of Denmark (Danish: Forbundne, forpligtet, for Kongeriget Danmark) | Son of Margrethe II. Appointed while Crown Prince (1972–2024). |
| 43 | 16 April 2004 | | Prince Joachim of Denmark | Prince of Denmark (1969–present) | Denmark | | Son of Margrethe II. Appointed in honour of the Queen's 64th birthday. |
Frederik X (2024–present)
| 44 | 26 May 2024 | | Queen Mary of Denmark | Crown Princess of Denmark (2004–2024); Queen consort of Denmark (2024–Present) | Denmark | | Consort of Frederik X. Appointed in honour of the King's 56th birthday. |
| 45 | 15 October 2026 | | Christian, Crown Prince of Denmark | Prince of Denmark (2005-2024) Crown Prince of Denmark (2024-Present) | Denmark | | Son of Frederik XCrown Prince of DenmarkAppointed in honour of his 21st birthday. |

== See also ==
- Order of the Dannebrog
- Order of the Elephant
